

557001–557100 

|-bgcolor=#E9E9E9
| 557001 ||  || — || November 17, 2006 || Kitt Peak || Spacewatch ||  || align=right | 2.2 km || 
|-id=002 bgcolor=#E9E9E9
| 557002 ||  || — || March 22, 2012 || Palomar || PTF ||  || align=right | 2.7 km || 
|-id=003 bgcolor=#d6d6d6
| 557003 ||  || — || September 23, 2009 || Kitt Peak || Spacewatch ||  || align=right | 2.4 km || 
|-id=004 bgcolor=#E9E9E9
| 557004 ||  || — || September 2, 2014 || Haleakala || Pan-STARRS ||  || align=right | 1.6 km || 
|-id=005 bgcolor=#d6d6d6
| 557005 ||  || — || February 5, 2011 || Haleakala || Pan-STARRS ||  || align=right | 1.8 km || 
|-id=006 bgcolor=#E9E9E9
| 557006 ||  || — || October 1, 2005 || Mount Lemmon || Mount Lemmon Survey ||  || align=right | 1.8 km || 
|-id=007 bgcolor=#E9E9E9
| 557007 ||  || — || October 28, 2001 || Palomar || NEAT || JUN || align=right data-sort-value="0.77" | 770 m || 
|-id=008 bgcolor=#E9E9E9
| 557008 ||  || — || August 25, 2014 || Haleakala || Pan-STARRS ||  || align=right | 1.6 km || 
|-id=009 bgcolor=#fefefe
| 557009 ||  || — || September 18, 2009 || Kitt Peak || Spacewatch || H || align=right data-sort-value="0.51" | 510 m || 
|-id=010 bgcolor=#fefefe
| 557010 ||  || — || September 14, 2014 || Haleakala || Pan-STARRS || H || align=right data-sort-value="0.62" | 620 m || 
|-id=011 bgcolor=#E9E9E9
| 557011 ||  || — || August 6, 2014 || Haleakala || Pan-STARRS ||  || align=right | 1.5 km || 
|-id=012 bgcolor=#E9E9E9
| 557012 ||  || — || November 5, 2010 || Kitt Peak || Spacewatch ||  || align=right | 1.2 km || 
|-id=013 bgcolor=#E9E9E9
| 557013 ||  || — || September 25, 2006 || Catalina || CSS ||  || align=right | 1.00 km || 
|-id=014 bgcolor=#E9E9E9
| 557014 ||  || — || May 15, 2013 || Haleakala || Pan-STARRS ||  || align=right | 1.3 km || 
|-id=015 bgcolor=#E9E9E9
| 557015 ||  || — || April 7, 2013 || Kitt Peak || Spacewatch ||  || align=right | 1.3 km || 
|-id=016 bgcolor=#E9E9E9
| 557016 ||  || — || August 30, 2014 || Kitt Peak || Spacewatch ||  || align=right data-sort-value="0.81" | 810 m || 
|-id=017 bgcolor=#E9E9E9
| 557017 ||  || — || August 31, 2005 || Kitt Peak || Spacewatch ||  || align=right | 1.4 km || 
|-id=018 bgcolor=#d6d6d6
| 557018 ||  || — || February 1, 2006 || Kitt Peak || Spacewatch ||  || align=right | 2.7 km || 
|-id=019 bgcolor=#fefefe
| 557019 ||  || — || March 25, 2009 || Sandlot || G. Hug ||  || align=right data-sort-value="0.84" | 840 m || 
|-id=020 bgcolor=#E9E9E9
| 557020 ||  || — || October 14, 2010 || Mount Lemmon || Mount Lemmon Survey ||  || align=right | 1.4 km || 
|-id=021 bgcolor=#E9E9E9
| 557021 ||  || — || May 17, 2012 || Mount Lemmon || Mount Lemmon Survey ||  || align=right | 2.0 km || 
|-id=022 bgcolor=#E9E9E9
| 557022 ||  || — || October 18, 2010 || Kitt Peak || Spacewatch ||  || align=right data-sort-value="0.88" | 880 m || 
|-id=023 bgcolor=#E9E9E9
| 557023 ||  || — || January 19, 2012 || Haleakala || Pan-STARRS ||  || align=right | 1.7 km || 
|-id=024 bgcolor=#E9E9E9
| 557024 ||  || — || October 30, 2006 || Mount Lemmon || Mount Lemmon Survey ||  || align=right | 2.4 km || 
|-id=025 bgcolor=#E9E9E9
| 557025 ||  || — || March 11, 2008 || Kitt Peak || Spacewatch ||  || align=right | 2.2 km || 
|-id=026 bgcolor=#E9E9E9
| 557026 ||  || — || April 21, 2009 || Kitt Peak || Spacewatch ||  || align=right | 1.0 km || 
|-id=027 bgcolor=#E9E9E9
| 557027 ||  || — || September 14, 2014 || Catalina || CSS ||  || align=right | 1.0 km || 
|-id=028 bgcolor=#E9E9E9
| 557028 ||  || — || November 25, 2006 || Mount Lemmon || Mount Lemmon Survey ||  || align=right | 2.2 km || 
|-id=029 bgcolor=#E9E9E9
| 557029 ||  || — || February 10, 2008 || Kitt Peak || Spacewatch ||  || align=right | 1.3 km || 
|-id=030 bgcolor=#E9E9E9
| 557030 ||  || — || December 14, 2006 || Mount Lemmon || Mount Lemmon Survey ||  || align=right | 1.1 km || 
|-id=031 bgcolor=#E9E9E9
| 557031 ||  || — || June 30, 2014 || Haleakala || Pan-STARRS || EUN || align=right data-sort-value="0.84" | 840 m || 
|-id=032 bgcolor=#E9E9E9
| 557032 ||  || — || November 24, 2002 || Palomar || NEAT ||  || align=right | 1.8 km || 
|-id=033 bgcolor=#E9E9E9
| 557033 ||  || — || September 15, 2009 || Kitt Peak || Spacewatch ||  || align=right | 1.9 km || 
|-id=034 bgcolor=#E9E9E9
| 557034 ||  || — || September 25, 2014 || Kitt Peak || Spacewatch ||  || align=right | 2.4 km || 
|-id=035 bgcolor=#E9E9E9
| 557035 ||  || — || September 25, 2014 || Kitt Peak || Spacewatch ||  || align=right | 1.4 km || 
|-id=036 bgcolor=#E9E9E9
| 557036 ||  || — || August 31, 2005 || Kitt Peak || Spacewatch ||  || align=right | 1.4 km || 
|-id=037 bgcolor=#E9E9E9
| 557037 ||  || — || December 13, 2006 || Kitt Peak || Spacewatch ||  || align=right | 1.2 km || 
|-id=038 bgcolor=#E9E9E9
| 557038 ||  || — || August 30, 2005 || Kitt Peak || Spacewatch ||  || align=right | 1.2 km || 
|-id=039 bgcolor=#E9E9E9
| 557039 ||  || — || September 30, 2010 || Mount Lemmon || Mount Lemmon Survey ||  || align=right | 1.3 km || 
|-id=040 bgcolor=#E9E9E9
| 557040 ||  || — || November 30, 2010 || Mount Lemmon || Mount Lemmon Survey ||  || align=right | 1.6 km || 
|-id=041 bgcolor=#E9E9E9
| 557041 ||  || — || September 15, 2009 || Bisei SG Center || N. Hashimoto, S. Okumura ||  || align=right | 2.1 km || 
|-id=042 bgcolor=#E9E9E9
| 557042 ||  || — || September 24, 2014 || Mount Lemmon || Mount Lemmon Survey ||  || align=right | 1.3 km || 
|-id=043 bgcolor=#E9E9E9
| 557043 ||  || — || September 2, 2014 || Haleakala || Pan-STARRS ||  || align=right | 2.0 km || 
|-id=044 bgcolor=#E9E9E9
| 557044 ||  || — || March 27, 2008 || Mount Lemmon || Mount Lemmon Survey ||  || align=right | 1.6 km || 
|-id=045 bgcolor=#E9E9E9
| 557045 Nadolschi ||  ||  || March 13, 2008 || La Silla || EURONEAR || (5) || align=right data-sort-value="0.92" | 920 m || 
|-id=046 bgcolor=#E9E9E9
| 557046 ||  || — || August 31, 2005 || Kitt Peak || Spacewatch ||  || align=right | 1.1 km || 
|-id=047 bgcolor=#E9E9E9
| 557047 ||  || — || October 8, 2005 || Kitt Peak || Spacewatch ||  || align=right | 1.5 km || 
|-id=048 bgcolor=#E9E9E9
| 557048 ||  || — || September 26, 2014 || Kitt Peak || Spacewatch ||  || align=right | 1.2 km || 
|-id=049 bgcolor=#E9E9E9
| 557049 ||  || — || October 26, 2005 || Kitt Peak || Spacewatch ||  || align=right | 1.9 km || 
|-id=050 bgcolor=#E9E9E9
| 557050 ||  || — || November 6, 2010 || Mount Lemmon || Mount Lemmon Survey ||  || align=right | 1.3 km || 
|-id=051 bgcolor=#E9E9E9
| 557051 ||  || — || February 27, 2012 || Haleakala || Pan-STARRS ||  || align=right | 1.2 km || 
|-id=052 bgcolor=#fefefe
| 557052 ||  || — || April 13, 2013 || Haleakala || Pan-STARRS ||  || align=right data-sort-value="0.72" | 720 m || 
|-id=053 bgcolor=#fefefe
| 557053 ||  || — || September 15, 2006 || Kitt Peak || Spacewatch ||  || align=right data-sort-value="0.82" | 820 m || 
|-id=054 bgcolor=#E9E9E9
| 557054 ||  || — || March 30, 2012 || Mount Lemmon || Mount Lemmon Survey ||  || align=right | 1.6 km || 
|-id=055 bgcolor=#E9E9E9
| 557055 ||  || — || February 23, 2007 || Mount Lemmon || Mount Lemmon Survey ||  || align=right | 1.5 km || 
|-id=056 bgcolor=#E9E9E9
| 557056 ||  || — || November 14, 2010 || Kitt Peak || Spacewatch ||  || align=right | 1.1 km || 
|-id=057 bgcolor=#E9E9E9
| 557057 ||  || — || November 10, 2010 || Mount Lemmon || Mount Lemmon Survey ||  || align=right data-sort-value="0.80" | 800 m || 
|-id=058 bgcolor=#E9E9E9
| 557058 ||  || — || September 23, 2014 || Mount Lemmon || Mount Lemmon Survey ||  || align=right | 1.2 km || 
|-id=059 bgcolor=#E9E9E9
| 557059 ||  || — || December 10, 2010 || Mount Lemmon || Mount Lemmon Survey ||  || align=right | 1.8 km || 
|-id=060 bgcolor=#E9E9E9
| 557060 ||  || — || October 15, 2001 || Kitt Peak || Spacewatch ||  || align=right | 1.5 km || 
|-id=061 bgcolor=#E9E9E9
| 557061 ||  || — || March 23, 2003 || Apache Point || SDSS Collaboration ||  || align=right | 2.3 km || 
|-id=062 bgcolor=#E9E9E9
| 557062 ||  || — || August 24, 2001 || Kitt Peak || Spacewatch ||  || align=right data-sort-value="0.98" | 980 m || 
|-id=063 bgcolor=#E9E9E9
| 557063 ||  || — || December 13, 2010 || Mount Lemmon || Mount Lemmon Survey ||  || align=right | 1.9 km || 
|-id=064 bgcolor=#E9E9E9
| 557064 ||  || — || January 17, 2007 || Kitt Peak || Spacewatch || MIS || align=right | 2.4 km || 
|-id=065 bgcolor=#fefefe
| 557065 ||  || — || April 5, 2008 || Mount Lemmon || Mount Lemmon Survey || H || align=right data-sort-value="0.41" | 410 m || 
|-id=066 bgcolor=#E9E9E9
| 557066 ||  || — || December 17, 2001 || Socorro || LINEAR ||  || align=right | 1.3 km || 
|-id=067 bgcolor=#E9E9E9
| 557067 ||  || — || February 27, 2012 || Haleakala || Pan-STARRS ||  || align=right | 2.3 km || 
|-id=068 bgcolor=#E9E9E9
| 557068 ||  || — || September 29, 2014 || Kitt Peak || Spacewatch ||  || align=right | 1.2 km || 
|-id=069 bgcolor=#E9E9E9
| 557069 ||  || — || August 28, 2014 || Haleakala || Pan-STARRS ||  || align=right | 1.3 km || 
|-id=070 bgcolor=#E9E9E9
| 557070 ||  || — || September 14, 2014 || Mount Lemmon || Mount Lemmon Survey ||  || align=right | 1.6 km || 
|-id=071 bgcolor=#E9E9E9
| 557071 ||  || — || September 3, 2010 || Mount Lemmon || Mount Lemmon Survey ||  || align=right | 1.5 km || 
|-id=072 bgcolor=#E9E9E9
| 557072 ||  || — || September 27, 2005 || Kitt Peak || Spacewatch || NEM || align=right | 2.3 km || 
|-id=073 bgcolor=#E9E9E9
| 557073 ||  || — || May 8, 2013 || Haleakala || Pan-STARRS ||  || align=right | 1.2 km || 
|-id=074 bgcolor=#E9E9E9
| 557074 ||  || — || September 30, 2014 || Kitt Peak || Spacewatch ||  || align=right | 1.9 km || 
|-id=075 bgcolor=#E9E9E9
| 557075 ||  || — || September 2, 2014 || Haleakala || Pan-STARRS ||  || align=right | 1.2 km || 
|-id=076 bgcolor=#E9E9E9
| 557076 ||  || — || February 17, 2007 || Kitt Peak || Spacewatch ||  || align=right | 1.1 km || 
|-id=077 bgcolor=#E9E9E9
| 557077 ||  || — || September 19, 2014 || Haleakala || Pan-STARRS ||  || align=right | 1.8 km || 
|-id=078 bgcolor=#E9E9E9
| 557078 ||  || — || April 28, 2004 || Kitt Peak || Spacewatch ||  || align=right | 1.7 km || 
|-id=079 bgcolor=#d6d6d6
| 557079 ||  || — || September 7, 2004 || Kitt Peak || Spacewatch ||  || align=right | 2.7 km || 
|-id=080 bgcolor=#E9E9E9
| 557080 ||  || — || September 30, 2014 || Kitt Peak || Spacewatch ||  || align=right | 1.9 km || 
|-id=081 bgcolor=#E9E9E9
| 557081 ||  || — || October 2, 2006 || Mount Lemmon || Mount Lemmon Survey ||  || align=right data-sort-value="0.73" | 730 m || 
|-id=082 bgcolor=#C2FFFF
| 557082 ||  || — || December 8, 2015 || Haleakala || Pan-STARRS || L5 || align=right | 6.3 km || 
|-id=083 bgcolor=#fefefe
| 557083 ||  || — || September 20, 2014 || Haleakala || Pan-STARRS || H || align=right data-sort-value="0.48" | 480 m || 
|-id=084 bgcolor=#fefefe
| 557084 ||  || — || April 13, 2013 || Kitt Peak || Spacewatch || H || align=right data-sort-value="0.54" | 540 m || 
|-id=085 bgcolor=#E9E9E9
| 557085 ||  || — || April 29, 2008 || Mount Lemmon || Mount Lemmon Survey ||  || align=right | 2.3 km || 
|-id=086 bgcolor=#E9E9E9
| 557086 ||  || — || January 30, 2008 || Kitt Peak || Spacewatch ||  || align=right data-sort-value="0.89" | 890 m || 
|-id=087 bgcolor=#E9E9E9
| 557087 ||  || — || August 30, 2005 || Kitt Peak || Spacewatch ||  || align=right | 1.3 km || 
|-id=088 bgcolor=#E9E9E9
| 557088 ||  || — || October 27, 2005 || Mount Lemmon || Mount Lemmon Survey ||  || align=right | 1.5 km || 
|-id=089 bgcolor=#E9E9E9
| 557089 ||  || — || September 19, 2014 || Haleakala || Pan-STARRS ||  || align=right | 1.6 km || 
|-id=090 bgcolor=#E9E9E9
| 557090 ||  || — || January 10, 2007 || Mount Lemmon || Mount Lemmon Survey ||  || align=right | 1.5 km || 
|-id=091 bgcolor=#E9E9E9
| 557091 ||  || — || September 20, 2014 || Haleakala || Pan-STARRS ||  || align=right | 1.5 km || 
|-id=092 bgcolor=#E9E9E9
| 557092 ||  || — || January 17, 2007 || Kitt Peak || Spacewatch ||  || align=right | 2.1 km || 
|-id=093 bgcolor=#E9E9E9
| 557093 ||  || — || August 24, 2001 || Kitt Peak || Spacewatch ||  || align=right data-sort-value="0.94" | 940 m || 
|-id=094 bgcolor=#E9E9E9
| 557094 ||  || — || December 15, 2006 || Kitt Peak || Spacewatch ||  || align=right | 2.5 km || 
|-id=095 bgcolor=#E9E9E9
| 557095 ||  || — || September 16, 2014 || Haleakala || Pan-STARRS ||  || align=right | 1.2 km || 
|-id=096 bgcolor=#E9E9E9
| 557096 ||  || — || September 18, 2014 || Haleakala || Pan-STARRS ||  || align=right | 1.2 km || 
|-id=097 bgcolor=#E9E9E9
| 557097 ||  || — || November 1, 2005 || Mount Lemmon || Mount Lemmon Survey ||  || align=right | 2.4 km || 
|-id=098 bgcolor=#E9E9E9
| 557098 ||  || — || September 19, 2014 || Haleakala || Pan-STARRS ||  || align=right | 1.1 km || 
|-id=099 bgcolor=#E9E9E9
| 557099 ||  || — || October 25, 2005 || Mount Lemmon || Mount Lemmon Survey ||  || align=right | 1.6 km || 
|-id=100 bgcolor=#E9E9E9
| 557100 ||  || — || September 19, 2014 || Haleakala || Pan-STARRS ||  || align=right | 1.4 km || 
|}

557101–557200 

|-bgcolor=#E9E9E9
| 557101 ||  || — || October 18, 2006 || Kitt Peak || Spacewatch ||  || align=right data-sort-value="0.69" | 690 m || 
|-id=102 bgcolor=#E9E9E9
| 557102 ||  || — || November 8, 2010 || Mount Lemmon || Mount Lemmon Survey ||  || align=right | 1.6 km || 
|-id=103 bgcolor=#E9E9E9
| 557103 ||  || — || August 27, 2014 || Haleakala || Pan-STARRS ||  || align=right | 1.4 km || 
|-id=104 bgcolor=#E9E9E9
| 557104 ||  || — || February 28, 2008 || Kitt Peak || Spacewatch ||  || align=right data-sort-value="0.82" | 820 m || 
|-id=105 bgcolor=#d6d6d6
| 557105 ||  || — || September 30, 2009 || Mount Lemmon || Mount Lemmon Survey ||  || align=right | 2.9 km || 
|-id=106 bgcolor=#d6d6d6
| 557106 ||  || — || September 30, 2014 || Mount Lemmon || Mount Lemmon Survey ||  || align=right | 1.7 km || 
|-id=107 bgcolor=#E9E9E9
| 557107 ||  || — || September 20, 2014 || Haleakala || Pan-STARRS ||  || align=right | 2.1 km || 
|-id=108 bgcolor=#E9E9E9
| 557108 ||  || — || April 12, 2004 || Bergisch Gladbach || W. Bickel ||  || align=right | 1.2 km || 
|-id=109 bgcolor=#E9E9E9
| 557109 ||  || — || September 25, 2014 || Mount Lemmon || Mount Lemmon Survey ||  || align=right | 1.1 km || 
|-id=110 bgcolor=#E9E9E9
| 557110 ||  || — || December 20, 2001 || Palomar || NEAT ||  || align=right | 1.8 km || 
|-id=111 bgcolor=#C2FFFF
| 557111 ||  || — || September 22, 2014 || Haleakala || Pan-STARRS || L5 || align=right | 10 km || 
|-id=112 bgcolor=#E9E9E9
| 557112 ||  || — || October 14, 2010 || Mount Lemmon || Mount Lemmon Survey ||  || align=right data-sort-value="0.67" | 670 m || 
|-id=113 bgcolor=#d6d6d6
| 557113 ||  || — || September 29, 2014 || Haleakala || Pan-STARRS ||  || align=right | 2.1 km || 
|-id=114 bgcolor=#E9E9E9
| 557114 ||  || — || November 3, 2005 || Mount Lemmon || Mount Lemmon Survey ||  || align=right | 2.0 km || 
|-id=115 bgcolor=#E9E9E9
| 557115 ||  || — || October 14, 2001 || Socorro || LINEAR ||  || align=right | 1.7 km || 
|-id=116 bgcolor=#d6d6d6
| 557116 ||  || — || September 20, 2003 || Socorro || LINEAR ||  || align=right | 2.5 km || 
|-id=117 bgcolor=#E9E9E9
| 557117 ||  || — || October 1, 2014 || Catalina || CSS ||  || align=right | 1.2 km || 
|-id=118 bgcolor=#E9E9E9
| 557118 ||  || — || October 22, 2005 || Kitt Peak || Spacewatch ||  || align=right | 1.9 km || 
|-id=119 bgcolor=#E9E9E9
| 557119 ||  || — || November 14, 1996 || Kitt Peak || Spacewatch ||  || align=right | 1.9 km || 
|-id=120 bgcolor=#E9E9E9
| 557120 ||  || — || September 13, 2005 || Kitt Peak || Spacewatch ||  || align=right | 2.2 km || 
|-id=121 bgcolor=#fefefe
| 557121 ||  || — || April 6, 2008 || Kitt Peak || Spacewatch || H || align=right data-sort-value="0.44" | 440 m || 
|-id=122 bgcolor=#fefefe
| 557122 ||  || — || December 27, 2011 || Mount Lemmon || Mount Lemmon Survey ||  || align=right data-sort-value="0.59" | 590 m || 
|-id=123 bgcolor=#E9E9E9
| 557123 ||  || — || February 27, 2012 || Haleakala || Pan-STARRS ||  || align=right | 1.2 km || 
|-id=124 bgcolor=#E9E9E9
| 557124 ||  || — || January 27, 2007 || Kitt Peak || Spacewatch ||  || align=right | 2.0 km || 
|-id=125 bgcolor=#E9E9E9
| 557125 ||  || — || October 2, 2014 || Kitt Peak || Spacewatch ||  || align=right | 1.2 km || 
|-id=126 bgcolor=#fefefe
| 557126 ||  || — || February 10, 2008 || Mount Lemmon || Mount Lemmon Survey || H || align=right data-sort-value="0.52" | 520 m || 
|-id=127 bgcolor=#fefefe
| 557127 ||  || — || April 30, 2008 || Mount Lemmon || Mount Lemmon Survey || H || align=right data-sort-value="0.76" | 760 m || 
|-id=128 bgcolor=#E9E9E9
| 557128 ||  || — || September 19, 2014 || Haleakala || Pan-STARRS ||  || align=right | 1.2 km || 
|-id=129 bgcolor=#E9E9E9
| 557129 ||  || — || September 30, 2005 || Mount Lemmon || Mount Lemmon Survey ||  || align=right | 1.7 km || 
|-id=130 bgcolor=#E9E9E9
| 557130 ||  || — || September 24, 2005 || Kitt Peak || Spacewatch ||  || align=right | 1.3 km || 
|-id=131 bgcolor=#E9E9E9
| 557131 ||  || — || October 30, 2010 || Mount Lemmon || Mount Lemmon Survey ||  || align=right | 2.2 km || 
|-id=132 bgcolor=#E9E9E9
| 557132 ||  || — || September 23, 2014 || Mount Lemmon || Mount Lemmon Survey ||  || align=right | 1.9 km || 
|-id=133 bgcolor=#E9E9E9
| 557133 ||  || — || October 1, 2005 || Mount Lemmon || Mount Lemmon Survey ||  || align=right | 1.3 km || 
|-id=134 bgcolor=#E9E9E9
| 557134 ||  || — || July 18, 2001 || Kitt Peak || Spacewatch ||  || align=right | 1.5 km || 
|-id=135 bgcolor=#E9E9E9
| 557135 ||  || — || February 9, 2008 || Mount Lemmon || Mount Lemmon Survey ||  || align=right data-sort-value="0.88" | 880 m || 
|-id=136 bgcolor=#E9E9E9
| 557136 ||  || — || April 13, 2012 || Haleakala || Pan-STARRS ||  || align=right | 2.1 km || 
|-id=137 bgcolor=#E9E9E9
| 557137 ||  || — || September 19, 2014 || Haleakala || Pan-STARRS ||  || align=right | 1.5 km || 
|-id=138 bgcolor=#d6d6d6
| 557138 ||  || — || September 22, 2009 || Kitt Peak || Spacewatch ||  || align=right | 2.0 km || 
|-id=139 bgcolor=#E9E9E9
| 557139 ||  || — || October 2, 2014 || Mount Lemmon || Mount Lemmon Survey ||  || align=right data-sort-value="0.63" | 630 m || 
|-id=140 bgcolor=#E9E9E9
| 557140 ||  || — || November 2, 2010 || Mount Lemmon || Mount Lemmon Survey ||  || align=right | 1.4 km || 
|-id=141 bgcolor=#fefefe
| 557141 ||  || — || September 7, 2014 || Haleakala || Pan-STARRS || H || align=right data-sort-value="0.84" | 840 m || 
|-id=142 bgcolor=#E9E9E9
| 557142 ||  || — || September 24, 2014 || Kitt Peak || Spacewatch ||  || align=right | 2.1 km || 
|-id=143 bgcolor=#E9E9E9
| 557143 ||  || — || December 3, 2010 || Mount Lemmon || Mount Lemmon Survey ||  || align=right | 1.3 km || 
|-id=144 bgcolor=#E9E9E9
| 557144 ||  || — || October 2, 2014 || Haleakala || Pan-STARRS ||  || align=right | 1.5 km || 
|-id=145 bgcolor=#E9E9E9
| 557145 ||  || — || October 2, 2014 || Haleakala || Pan-STARRS ||  || align=right | 1.1 km || 
|-id=146 bgcolor=#E9E9E9
| 557146 ||  || — || August 30, 2005 || Kitt Peak || Spacewatch ||  || align=right | 1.2 km || 
|-id=147 bgcolor=#E9E9E9
| 557147 ||  || — || March 23, 2012 || Mount Lemmon || Mount Lemmon Survey ||  || align=right | 1.2 km || 
|-id=148 bgcolor=#E9E9E9
| 557148 ||  || — || February 7, 2008 || Mount Lemmon || Mount Lemmon Survey ||  || align=right data-sort-value="0.94" | 940 m || 
|-id=149 bgcolor=#E9E9E9
| 557149 ||  || — || December 1, 2005 || Mount Lemmon || Mount Lemmon Survey ||  || align=right | 1.7 km || 
|-id=150 bgcolor=#E9E9E9
| 557150 ||  || — || February 7, 2003 || La Silla || Astrovirtel ||  || align=right | 1.2 km || 
|-id=151 bgcolor=#E9E9E9
| 557151 ||  || — || September 25, 2006 || Kitt Peak || Spacewatch ||  || align=right | 1.0 km || 
|-id=152 bgcolor=#FA8072
| 557152 ||  || — || October 5, 2004 || Kitt Peak || Spacewatch || H || align=right data-sort-value="0.41" | 410 m || 
|-id=153 bgcolor=#E9E9E9
| 557153 ||  || — || April 10, 2013 || Haleakala || Pan-STARRS ||  || align=right | 1.6 km || 
|-id=154 bgcolor=#fefefe
| 557154 ||  || — || September 3, 2014 || Catalina || CSS || H || align=right data-sort-value="0.49" | 490 m || 
|-id=155 bgcolor=#E9E9E9
| 557155 ||  || — || August 14, 2001 || Haleakala || AMOS ||  || align=right | 1.4 km || 
|-id=156 bgcolor=#E9E9E9
| 557156 ||  || — || October 12, 2014 || Mount Lemmon || Mount Lemmon Survey ||  || align=right | 1.00 km || 
|-id=157 bgcolor=#E9E9E9
| 557157 ||  || — || December 14, 2001 || Socorro || LINEAR ||  || align=right | 1.3 km || 
|-id=158 bgcolor=#E9E9E9
| 557158 ||  || — || October 17, 2010 || Mount Lemmon || Mount Lemmon Survey ||  || align=right | 1.3 km || 
|-id=159 bgcolor=#E9E9E9
| 557159 ||  || — || October 9, 2005 || Kitt Peak || Spacewatch ||  || align=right | 1.8 km || 
|-id=160 bgcolor=#E9E9E9
| 557160 ||  || — || April 12, 2008 || Kitt Peak || Spacewatch ||  || align=right | 2.1 km || 
|-id=161 bgcolor=#fefefe
| 557161 ||  || — || October 13, 2014 || Kitt Peak || Spacewatch ||  || align=right data-sort-value="0.64" | 640 m || 
|-id=162 bgcolor=#E9E9E9
| 557162 ||  || — || November 15, 2010 || Kitt Peak || Spacewatch ||  || align=right data-sort-value="0.85" | 850 m || 
|-id=163 bgcolor=#E9E9E9
| 557163 ||  || — || October 13, 2014 || Mount Lemmon || Mount Lemmon Survey ||  || align=right | 1.2 km || 
|-id=164 bgcolor=#E9E9E9
| 557164 ||  || — || June 16, 2001 || Kitt Peak || Spacewatch ||  || align=right | 1.4 km || 
|-id=165 bgcolor=#C2FFFF
| 557165 ||  || — || September 23, 2014 || Kitt Peak || Spacewatch || L5 || align=right | 10 km || 
|-id=166 bgcolor=#E9E9E9
| 557166 ||  || — || October 1, 2000 || Socorro || LINEAR ||  || align=right | 1.8 km || 
|-id=167 bgcolor=#E9E9E9
| 557167 ||  || — || October 6, 2005 || Kitt Peak || Spacewatch ||  || align=right | 2.1 km || 
|-id=168 bgcolor=#E9E9E9
| 557168 ||  || — || September 12, 2001 || Socorro || LINEAR ||  || align=right | 1.4 km || 
|-id=169 bgcolor=#E9E9E9
| 557169 ||  || — || November 8, 2010 || Kitt Peak || Spacewatch ||  || align=right | 1.4 km || 
|-id=170 bgcolor=#fefefe
| 557170 ||  || — || October 1, 2014 || Kitt Peak || Pan-STARRS || H || align=right data-sort-value="0.47" | 470 m || 
|-id=171 bgcolor=#E9E9E9
| 557171 ||  || — || February 27, 2008 || Kitt Peak || Spacewatch ||  || align=right | 1.7 km || 
|-id=172 bgcolor=#E9E9E9
| 557172 ||  || — || September 19, 2014 || Haleakala || Pan-STARRS ||  || align=right | 1.2 km || 
|-id=173 bgcolor=#E9E9E9
| 557173 ||  || — || May 5, 2000 || Haleakala || SDSS ||  || align=right | 1.4 km || 
|-id=174 bgcolor=#E9E9E9
| 557174 ||  || — || October 30, 2005 || Kitt Peak || Spacewatch ||  || align=right | 1.6 km || 
|-id=175 bgcolor=#E9E9E9
| 557175 ||  || — || September 14, 2014 || Kitt Peak || Spacewatch ||  || align=right | 1.4 km || 
|-id=176 bgcolor=#fefefe
| 557176 ||  || — || September 18, 2003 || Palomar || NEAT ||  || align=right data-sort-value="0.75" | 750 m || 
|-id=177 bgcolor=#E9E9E9
| 557177 ||  || — || November 3, 2010 || Kitt Peak || Spacewatch ||  || align=right | 1.1 km || 
|-id=178 bgcolor=#E9E9E9
| 557178 ||  || — || August 31, 2005 || Palomar || NEAT ||  || align=right | 1.9 km || 
|-id=179 bgcolor=#E9E9E9
| 557179 ||  || — || February 27, 2012 || Haleakala || Pan-STARRS ||  || align=right | 2.0 km || 
|-id=180 bgcolor=#fefefe
| 557180 ||  || — || October 15, 2014 || Kitt Peak || Spacewatch || H || align=right data-sort-value="0.63" | 630 m || 
|-id=181 bgcolor=#E9E9E9
| 557181 ||  || — || August 31, 2014 || Haleakala || Pan-STARRS ||  || align=right | 1.3 km || 
|-id=182 bgcolor=#C2FFFF
| 557182 ||  || — || April 30, 2009 || Kitt Peak || Spacewatch || L5 || align=right | 8.8 km || 
|-id=183 bgcolor=#d6d6d6
| 557183 ||  || — || October 12, 2009 || Mount Lemmon || Mount Lemmon Survey ||  || align=right | 3.9 km || 
|-id=184 bgcolor=#E9E9E9
| 557184 ||  || — || November 15, 2010 || Mount Lemmon || Mount Lemmon Survey ||  || align=right | 1.8 km || 
|-id=185 bgcolor=#E9E9E9
| 557185 ||  || — || September 14, 2001 || Palomar || NEAT ||  || align=right | 1.8 km || 
|-id=186 bgcolor=#E9E9E9
| 557186 ||  || — || October 13, 2014 || Mount Lemmon || Mount Lemmon Survey ||  || align=right | 1.4 km || 
|-id=187 bgcolor=#E9E9E9
| 557187 ||  || — || December 6, 2005 || Kitt Peak || Spacewatch ||  || align=right | 1.8 km || 
|-id=188 bgcolor=#E9E9E9
| 557188 ||  || — || September 30, 2014 || Catalina || CSS ||  || align=right | 2.0 km || 
|-id=189 bgcolor=#E9E9E9
| 557189 ||  || — || August 30, 2005 || Kitt Peak || Spacewatch ||  || align=right | 1.2 km || 
|-id=190 bgcolor=#E9E9E9
| 557190 ||  || — || October 1, 2005 || Mount Lemmon || Mount Lemmon Survey ||  || align=right | 1.7 km || 
|-id=191 bgcolor=#C2FFFF
| 557191 ||  || — || April 29, 2009 || Kitt Peak || Spacewatch || L5 || align=right | 9.8 km || 
|-id=192 bgcolor=#E9E9E9
| 557192 ||  || — || October 6, 2005 || Mount Lemmon || Mount Lemmon Survey ||  || align=right | 1.1 km || 
|-id=193 bgcolor=#E9E9E9
| 557193 ||  || — || November 4, 2005 || Catalina || CSS ||  || align=right | 2.2 km || 
|-id=194 bgcolor=#E9E9E9
| 557194 ||  || — || August 31, 2005 || Palomar || NEAT ||  || align=right | 1.4 km || 
|-id=195 bgcolor=#E9E9E9
| 557195 ||  || — || October 18, 2001 || Palomar || NEAT ||  || align=right | 1.3 km || 
|-id=196 bgcolor=#d6d6d6
| 557196 ||  || — || August 20, 2008 || Kitt Peak || Spacewatch ||  || align=right | 2.7 km || 
|-id=197 bgcolor=#E9E9E9
| 557197 ||  || — || October 1, 2005 || Mount Lemmon || Mount Lemmon Survey ||  || align=right | 1.3 km || 
|-id=198 bgcolor=#d6d6d6
| 557198 ||  || — || April 18, 2007 || Kitt Peak || Spacewatch ||  || align=right | 2.9 km || 
|-id=199 bgcolor=#E9E9E9
| 557199 ||  || — || December 27, 2005 || Kitt Peak || Spacewatch ||  || align=right | 1.4 km || 
|-id=200 bgcolor=#d6d6d6
| 557200 ||  || — || December 10, 2009 || Mount Lemmon || Mount Lemmon Survey ||  || align=right | 2.5 km || 
|}

557201–557300 

|-bgcolor=#fefefe
| 557201 ||  || — || April 11, 2008 || Kitt Peak || Spacewatch || H || align=right data-sort-value="0.53" | 530 m || 
|-id=202 bgcolor=#C2FFFF
| 557202 ||  || — || September 19, 2014 || Haleakala || Pan-STARRS || L5 || align=right | 6.9 km || 
|-id=203 bgcolor=#E9E9E9
| 557203 ||  || — || March 28, 2012 || Mount Lemmon || Mount Lemmon Survey ||  || align=right | 1.7 km || 
|-id=204 bgcolor=#E9E9E9
| 557204 ||  || — || September 19, 2014 || Haleakala || Pan-STARRS ||  || align=right | 1.5 km || 
|-id=205 bgcolor=#E9E9E9
| 557205 ||  || — || February 16, 2004 || Kitt Peak || Spacewatch ||  || align=right | 1.5 km || 
|-id=206 bgcolor=#E9E9E9
| 557206 ||  || — || December 2, 2010 || Mayhill-ISON || L. Elenin ||  || align=right | 1.2 km || 
|-id=207 bgcolor=#E9E9E9
| 557207 ||  || — || September 14, 2014 || Kitt Peak || Spacewatch ||  || align=right | 1.2 km || 
|-id=208 bgcolor=#E9E9E9
| 557208 ||  || — || September 29, 2014 || Haleakala || Pan-STARRS ||  || align=right | 1.6 km || 
|-id=209 bgcolor=#d6d6d6
| 557209 ||  || — || October 1, 2014 || Haleakala || Pan-STARRS ||  || align=right | 2.1 km || 
|-id=210 bgcolor=#E9E9E9
| 557210 ||  || — || November 13, 2010 || Kitt Peak || Spacewatch ||  || align=right | 1.7 km || 
|-id=211 bgcolor=#E9E9E9
| 557211 ||  || — || October 1, 2005 || Catalina || CSS ||  || align=right | 3.0 km || 
|-id=212 bgcolor=#E9E9E9
| 557212 ||  || — || October 1, 2014 || Haleakala || Pan-STARRS ||  || align=right | 1.9 km || 
|-id=213 bgcolor=#E9E9E9
| 557213 ||  || — || November 1, 2010 || Mount Lemmon || Mount Lemmon Survey ||  || align=right data-sort-value="0.69" | 690 m || 
|-id=214 bgcolor=#fefefe
| 557214 ||  || — || October 15, 2014 || Kitt Peak || Spacewatch || H || align=right data-sort-value="0.46" | 460 m || 
|-id=215 bgcolor=#E9E9E9
| 557215 ||  || — || August 22, 2014 || Haleakala || Pan-STARRS ||  || align=right | 2.3 km || 
|-id=216 bgcolor=#E9E9E9
| 557216 ||  || — || October 13, 2014 || Mount Lemmon || Mount Lemmon Survey ||  || align=right | 1.3 km || 
|-id=217 bgcolor=#d6d6d6
| 557217 ||  || — || October 5, 2014 || Kitt Peak || Spacewatch ||  || align=right | 2.1 km || 
|-id=218 bgcolor=#E9E9E9
| 557218 ||  || — || January 26, 2011 || Mount Lemmon || Mount Lemmon Survey ||  || align=right | 2.5 km || 
|-id=219 bgcolor=#fefefe
| 557219 ||  || — || October 3, 2014 || Haleakala || Pan-STARRS || H || align=right data-sort-value="0.64" | 640 m || 
|-id=220 bgcolor=#E9E9E9
| 557220 ||  || — || September 30, 2005 || Mount Lemmon || Mount Lemmon Survey ||  || align=right | 1.9 km || 
|-id=221 bgcolor=#E9E9E9
| 557221 ||  || — || December 10, 2010 || Mount Lemmon || Mount Lemmon Survey ||  || align=right | 1.5 km || 
|-id=222 bgcolor=#E9E9E9
| 557222 ||  || — || December 31, 2007 || Mount Lemmon || Mount Lemmon Survey ||  || align=right | 1.1 km || 
|-id=223 bgcolor=#E9E9E9
| 557223 ||  || — || October 3, 2014 || Mount Lemmon || Mount Lemmon Survey ||  || align=right | 1.8 km || 
|-id=224 bgcolor=#E9E9E9
| 557224 ||  || — || October 1, 2014 || Kitt Peak || Pan-STARRS ||  || align=right | 1.3 km || 
|-id=225 bgcolor=#E9E9E9
| 557225 ||  || — || December 13, 2010 || Mount Lemmon || Mount Lemmon Survey ||  || align=right | 2.0 km || 
|-id=226 bgcolor=#E9E9E9
| 557226 ||  || — || April 19, 2013 || Haleakala || Pan-STARRS ||  || align=right | 1.1 km || 
|-id=227 bgcolor=#E9E9E9
| 557227 ||  || — || December 14, 2010 || Mount Lemmon || Mount Lemmon Survey ||  || align=right | 1.6 km || 
|-id=228 bgcolor=#E9E9E9
| 557228 ||  || — || July 28, 2005 || Palomar || NEAT ||  || align=right | 1.6 km || 
|-id=229 bgcolor=#fefefe
| 557229 ||  || — || October 1, 2014 || Haleakala || Pan-STARRS ||  || align=right data-sort-value="0.53" | 530 m || 
|-id=230 bgcolor=#E9E9E9
| 557230 ||  || — || October 3, 2014 || Kitt Peak || Spacewatch ||  || align=right | 1.2 km || 
|-id=231 bgcolor=#fefefe
| 557231 ||  || — || October 14, 2014 || Mount Lemmon || Mount Lemmon Survey ||  || align=right data-sort-value="0.49" | 490 m || 
|-id=232 bgcolor=#E9E9E9
| 557232 ||  || — || October 5, 2014 || Mount Lemmon || Mount Lemmon Survey ||  || align=right | 1.6 km || 
|-id=233 bgcolor=#E9E9E9
| 557233 ||  || — || October 3, 2014 || Mount Lemmon || Mount Lemmon Survey ||  || align=right data-sort-value="0.85" | 850 m || 
|-id=234 bgcolor=#E9E9E9
| 557234 ||  || — || October 4, 2014 || Mount Lemmon || Mount Lemmon Survey ||  || align=right | 1.9 km || 
|-id=235 bgcolor=#E9E9E9
| 557235 ||  || — || October 4, 2014 || Haleakala || Pan-STARRS ||  || align=right | 1.4 km || 
|-id=236 bgcolor=#E9E9E9
| 557236 ||  || — || October 2, 2014 || Haleakala || Pan-STARRS ||  || align=right | 2.1 km || 
|-id=237 bgcolor=#d6d6d6
| 557237 ||  || — || October 1, 2014 || Haleakala || Pan-STARRS || 7:4 || align=right | 2.5 km || 
|-id=238 bgcolor=#d6d6d6
| 557238 ||  || — || October 14, 2014 || Mount Lemmon || Mount Lemmon Survey ||  || align=right | 2.3 km || 
|-id=239 bgcolor=#E9E9E9
| 557239 ||  || — || September 18, 2014 || Haleakala || Pan-STARRS ||  || align=right | 2.2 km || 
|-id=240 bgcolor=#E9E9E9
| 557240 ||  || — || November 5, 2010 || Mount Lemmon || Mount Lemmon Survey ||  || align=right | 1.7 km || 
|-id=241 bgcolor=#E9E9E9
| 557241 ||  || — || April 27, 2012 || Haleakala || Pan-STARRS ||  || align=right | 1.9 km || 
|-id=242 bgcolor=#E9E9E9
| 557242 ||  || — || October 20, 2001 || Socorro || LINEAR ||  || align=right | 1.8 km || 
|-id=243 bgcolor=#E9E9E9
| 557243 ||  || — || December 2, 2010 || Mount Lemmon || Mount Lemmon Survey ||  || align=right data-sort-value="0.83" | 830 m || 
|-id=244 bgcolor=#d6d6d6
| 557244 ||  || — || January 2, 2000 || Kitt Peak || Spacewatch ||  || align=right | 3.0 km || 
|-id=245 bgcolor=#d6d6d6
| 557245 ||  || — || October 22, 2003 || Kitt Peak || Spacewatch ||  || align=right | 3.3 km || 
|-id=246 bgcolor=#d6d6d6
| 557246 ||  || — || September 18, 2009 || Kitt Peak || Spacewatch ||  || align=right | 1.9 km || 
|-id=247 bgcolor=#E9E9E9
| 557247 ||  || — || August 5, 2005 || Palomar || NEAT ||  || align=right | 1.4 km || 
|-id=248 bgcolor=#d6d6d6
| 557248 ||  || — || November 21, 2009 || Mount Lemmon || Mount Lemmon Survey ||  || align=right | 1.8 km || 
|-id=249 bgcolor=#d6d6d6
| 557249 ||  || — || September 20, 2003 || Palomar || NEAT ||  || align=right | 3.1 km || 
|-id=250 bgcolor=#E9E9E9
| 557250 ||  || — || March 27, 2008 || Kitt Peak || Spacewatch ||  || align=right | 2.3 km || 
|-id=251 bgcolor=#E9E9E9
| 557251 ||  || — || October 29, 2005 || Kitt Peak || Spacewatch ||  || align=right | 1.7 km || 
|-id=252 bgcolor=#E9E9E9
| 557252 ||  || — || November 14, 2010 || Kitt Peak || Spacewatch ||  || align=right | 1.9 km || 
|-id=253 bgcolor=#E9E9E9
| 557253 ||  || — || October 13, 2005 || Kitt Peak || Spacewatch ||  || align=right | 1.5 km || 
|-id=254 bgcolor=#E9E9E9
| 557254 ||  || — || September 25, 2014 || Kitt Peak || Spacewatch ||  || align=right | 1.4 km || 
|-id=255 bgcolor=#E9E9E9
| 557255 ||  || — || August 29, 2009 || Kitt Peak || Spacewatch ||  || align=right | 1.8 km || 
|-id=256 bgcolor=#E9E9E9
| 557256 ||  || — || April 18, 2009 || Mount Lemmon || Mount Lemmon Survey ||  || align=right data-sort-value="0.69" | 690 m || 
|-id=257 bgcolor=#C2FFFF
| 557257 ||  || — || April 11, 2008 || Kitt Peak || Spacewatch || L5 || align=right | 8.5 km || 
|-id=258 bgcolor=#E9E9E9
| 557258 ||  || — || October 17, 2009 || Mount Lemmon || Mount Lemmon Survey ||  || align=right | 2.1 km || 
|-id=259 bgcolor=#d6d6d6
| 557259 ||  || — || September 16, 2003 || Kitt Peak || Spacewatch ||  || align=right | 2.3 km || 
|-id=260 bgcolor=#C2FFFF
| 557260 ||  || — || September 2, 2014 || La Palma || La Palma Obs. || L5 || align=right | 9.1 km || 
|-id=261 bgcolor=#d6d6d6
| 557261 ||  || — || February 25, 2011 || Mount Lemmon || Mount Lemmon Survey ||  || align=right | 2.2 km || 
|-id=262 bgcolor=#E9E9E9
| 557262 ||  || — || July 3, 2005 || Palomar || NEAT ||  || align=right | 1.1 km || 
|-id=263 bgcolor=#d6d6d6
| 557263 ||  || — || September 20, 2009 || Kitt Peak || Spacewatch ||  || align=right | 2.1 km || 
|-id=264 bgcolor=#E9E9E9
| 557264 ||  || — || January 28, 2007 || Kitt Peak || Spacewatch ||  || align=right | 1.8 km || 
|-id=265 bgcolor=#d6d6d6
| 557265 ||  || — || September 20, 2014 || Haleakala || Pan-STARRS ||  || align=right | 2.1 km || 
|-id=266 bgcolor=#d6d6d6
| 557266 ||  || — || January 8, 2011 || Mount Lemmon || Mount Lemmon Survey ||  || align=right | 3.1 km || 
|-id=267 bgcolor=#E9E9E9
| 557267 ||  || — || October 21, 2014 || Palomar || Mount Lemmon Survey ||  || align=right | 1.8 km || 
|-id=268 bgcolor=#E9E9E9
| 557268 ||  || — || July 1, 2013 || Kitt Peak || Pan-STARRS ||  || align=right | 1.9 km || 
|-id=269 bgcolor=#FA8072
| 557269 ||  || — || October 20, 2007 || Mount Lemmon || Mount Lemmon Survey ||  || align=right data-sort-value="0.81" | 810 m || 
|-id=270 bgcolor=#fefefe
| 557270 ||  || — || October 22, 2014 || Mount Lemmon || Mount Lemmon Survey || H || align=right data-sort-value="0.52" | 520 m || 
|-id=271 bgcolor=#fefefe
| 557271 ||  || — || October 23, 2014 || Mount Lemmon || Mount Lemmon Survey || H || align=right data-sort-value="0.59" | 590 m || 
|-id=272 bgcolor=#fefefe
| 557272 ||  || — || August 23, 2011 || Haleakala || Pan-STARRS || H || align=right data-sort-value="0.67" | 670 m || 
|-id=273 bgcolor=#E9E9E9
| 557273 ||  || — || July 30, 2001 || Palomar || NEAT ||  || align=right | 1.6 km || 
|-id=274 bgcolor=#E9E9E9
| 557274 ||  || — || October 18, 2014 || Mount Lemmon || Mount Lemmon Survey ||  || align=right | 1.8 km || 
|-id=275 bgcolor=#E9E9E9
| 557275 ||  || — || November 25, 2005 || Mount Lemmon || Mount Lemmon Survey ||  || align=right | 1.8 km || 
|-id=276 bgcolor=#E9E9E9
| 557276 ||  || — || October 18, 2014 || Mount Lemmon || Mount Lemmon Survey ||  || align=right | 1.7 km || 
|-id=277 bgcolor=#E9E9E9
| 557277 ||  || — || October 29, 2005 || Mount Lemmon || Mount Lemmon Survey ||  || align=right | 1.8 km || 
|-id=278 bgcolor=#E9E9E9
| 557278 ||  || — || September 30, 2006 || Mount Lemmon || Mount Lemmon Survey ||  || align=right | 1.1 km || 
|-id=279 bgcolor=#fefefe
| 557279 ||  || — || October 18, 2014 || Mount Lemmon || Mount Lemmon Survey ||  || align=right data-sort-value="0.70" | 700 m || 
|-id=280 bgcolor=#E9E9E9
| 557280 ||  || — || October 1, 2005 || Mount Lemmon || Mount Lemmon Survey ||  || align=right | 2.0 km || 
|-id=281 bgcolor=#d6d6d6
| 557281 ||  || — || April 7, 2005 || Kitt Peak || Spacewatch ||  || align=right | 3.2 km || 
|-id=282 bgcolor=#d6d6d6
| 557282 ||  || — || September 28, 2003 || Apache Point || SDSS Collaboration ||  || align=right | 2.3 km || 
|-id=283 bgcolor=#E9E9E9
| 557283 ||  || — || December 1, 2006 || Mount Lemmon || Mount Lemmon Survey ||  || align=right data-sort-value="0.94" | 940 m || 
|-id=284 bgcolor=#E9E9E9
| 557284 ||  || — || September 18, 2001 || Palomar || NEAT ||  || align=right | 3.2 km || 
|-id=285 bgcolor=#d6d6d6
| 557285 ||  || — || October 3, 2014 || Mount Lemmon || Mount Lemmon Survey ||  || align=right | 3.4 km || 
|-id=286 bgcolor=#E9E9E9
| 557286 ||  || — || August 17, 2009 || Kitt Peak || Spacewatch ||  || align=right | 1.9 km || 
|-id=287 bgcolor=#E9E9E9
| 557287 ||  || — || March 23, 1999 || Catalina || CSS ||  || align=right | 2.0 km || 
|-id=288 bgcolor=#E9E9E9
| 557288 ||  || — || July 13, 2013 || Kitt Peak || Pan-STARRS ||  || align=right | 2.2 km || 
|-id=289 bgcolor=#d6d6d6
| 557289 ||  || — || October 21, 2014 || Kitt Peak || Spacewatch ||  || align=right | 2.1 km || 
|-id=290 bgcolor=#E9E9E9
| 557290 ||  || — || September 29, 2005 || Kitt Peak || Spacewatch ||  || align=right | 1.9 km || 
|-id=291 bgcolor=#E9E9E9
| 557291 ||  || — || April 16, 2013 || Haleakala || Pan-STARRS ||  || align=right data-sort-value="0.70" | 700 m || 
|-id=292 bgcolor=#E9E9E9
| 557292 ||  || — || October 15, 2001 || Kitt Peak || Spacewatch ||  || align=right | 1.8 km || 
|-id=293 bgcolor=#E9E9E9
| 557293 ||  || — || October 21, 2014 || Kitt Peak || Spacewatch ||  || align=right | 1.1 km || 
|-id=294 bgcolor=#E9E9E9
| 557294 ||  || — || November 6, 2010 || Kitt Peak || Spacewatch ||  || align=right data-sort-value="0.76" | 760 m || 
|-id=295 bgcolor=#E9E9E9
| 557295 ||  || — || January 4, 2011 || Mount Lemmon || Mount Lemmon Survey ||  || align=right | 1.9 km || 
|-id=296 bgcolor=#E9E9E9
| 557296 ||  || — || October 15, 2009 || Mount Lemmon || Mount Lemmon Survey ||  || align=right | 1.8 km || 
|-id=297 bgcolor=#E9E9E9
| 557297 ||  || — || February 26, 2012 || Kitt Peak || Spacewatch ||  || align=right | 2.0 km || 
|-id=298 bgcolor=#FA8072
| 557298 ||  || — || November 16, 2009 || Mount Lemmon || Mount Lemmon Survey || H || align=right data-sort-value="0.60" | 600 m || 
|-id=299 bgcolor=#E9E9E9
| 557299 ||  || — || October 18, 2014 || Mount Lemmon || Mount Lemmon Survey ||  || align=right | 2.0 km || 
|-id=300 bgcolor=#E9E9E9
| 557300 ||  || — || March 16, 2012 || Mount Lemmon || Mount Lemmon Survey ||  || align=right data-sort-value="0.76" | 760 m || 
|}

557301–557400 

|-bgcolor=#E9E9E9
| 557301 ||  || — || October 12, 2010 || Mount Lemmon || Mount Lemmon Survey ||  || align=right data-sort-value="0.77" | 770 m || 
|-id=302 bgcolor=#d6d6d6
| 557302 ||  || — || October 20, 2014 || Mount Lemmon || Mount Lemmon Survey ||  || align=right | 2.2 km || 
|-id=303 bgcolor=#E9E9E9
| 557303 ||  || — || October 20, 2014 || Mount Lemmon || Mount Lemmon Survey ||  || align=right | 2.1 km || 
|-id=304 bgcolor=#E9E9E9
| 557304 ||  || — || October 20, 2014 || Mount Lemmon || Mount Lemmon Survey ||  || align=right | 1.3 km || 
|-id=305 bgcolor=#E9E9E9
| 557305 ||  || — || October 1, 2005 || Mount Lemmon || Mount Lemmon Survey ||  || align=right | 1.9 km || 
|-id=306 bgcolor=#E9E9E9
| 557306 ||  || — || September 26, 2014 || Mount Lemmon || Mount Lemmon Survey ||  || align=right | 1.1 km || 
|-id=307 bgcolor=#E9E9E9
| 557307 ||  || — || October 21, 2014 || Mount Lemmon || Mount Lemmon Survey ||  || align=right | 1.1 km || 
|-id=308 bgcolor=#E9E9E9
| 557308 ||  || — || April 28, 2008 || Kitt Peak || Spacewatch ||  || align=right | 2.5 km || 
|-id=309 bgcolor=#E9E9E9
| 557309 ||  || — || October 29, 2010 || Mount Lemmon || Mount Lemmon Survey ||  || align=right data-sort-value="0.80" | 800 m || 
|-id=310 bgcolor=#d6d6d6
| 557310 ||  || — || March 29, 2012 || Kitt Peak || Spacewatch ||  || align=right | 2.8 km || 
|-id=311 bgcolor=#E9E9E9
| 557311 ||  || — || September 30, 2005 || Mount Lemmon || Mount Lemmon Survey ||  || align=right | 2.0 km || 
|-id=312 bgcolor=#E9E9E9
| 557312 ||  || — || February 12, 2008 || Kitt Peak || Spacewatch ||  || align=right | 1.3 km || 
|-id=313 bgcolor=#d6d6d6
| 557313 ||  || — || October 18, 2009 || Mount Lemmon || Mount Lemmon Survey ||  || align=right | 2.1 km || 
|-id=314 bgcolor=#d6d6d6
| 557314 ||  || — || October 21, 2014 || Mount Lemmon || Mount Lemmon Survey ||  || align=right | 2.1 km || 
|-id=315 bgcolor=#d6d6d6
| 557315 ||  || — || October 22, 2009 || Mount Lemmon || Mount Lemmon Survey ||  || align=right | 2.2 km || 
|-id=316 bgcolor=#E9E9E9
| 557316 ||  || — || August 25, 2004 || Kitt Peak || Spacewatch ||  || align=right | 2.1 km || 
|-id=317 bgcolor=#E9E9E9
| 557317 ||  || — || September 24, 2014 || Mount Lemmon || Mount Lemmon Survey ||  || align=right | 1.3 km || 
|-id=318 bgcolor=#E9E9E9
| 557318 ||  || — || October 29, 2005 || Mount Lemmon || Mount Lemmon Survey ||  || align=right | 1.4 km || 
|-id=319 bgcolor=#E9E9E9
| 557319 ||  || — || November 3, 2005 || Mount Lemmon || Mount Lemmon Survey ||  || align=right | 2.0 km || 
|-id=320 bgcolor=#E9E9E9
| 557320 ||  || — || February 10, 2007 || Mount Lemmon || Mount Lemmon Survey ||  || align=right | 1.3 km || 
|-id=321 bgcolor=#d6d6d6
| 557321 ||  || — || September 24, 2014 || Mount Lemmon || Mount Lemmon Survey ||  || align=right | 2.4 km || 
|-id=322 bgcolor=#E9E9E9
| 557322 ||  || — || December 21, 2005 || Kitt Peak || Spacewatch ||  || align=right | 1.7 km || 
|-id=323 bgcolor=#E9E9E9
| 557323 ||  || — || October 22, 2014 || Mount Lemmon || Mount Lemmon Survey ||  || align=right | 1.7 km || 
|-id=324 bgcolor=#E9E9E9
| 557324 ||  || — || March 23, 2012 || Mount Lemmon || Mount Lemmon Survey ||  || align=right | 1.8 km || 
|-id=325 bgcolor=#E9E9E9
| 557325 ||  || — || March 31, 2008 || Kitt Peak || Spacewatch ||  || align=right | 1.2 km || 
|-id=326 bgcolor=#d6d6d6
| 557326 ||  || — || January 15, 2005 || Kitt Peak || Spacewatch ||  || align=right | 2.7 km || 
|-id=327 bgcolor=#E9E9E9
| 557327 ||  || — || November 3, 2010 || Kitt Peak || Spacewatch ||  || align=right data-sort-value="0.83" | 830 m || 
|-id=328 bgcolor=#E9E9E9
| 557328 ||  || — || September 16, 2009 || Kitt Peak || Spacewatch ||  || align=right | 1.9 km || 
|-id=329 bgcolor=#E9E9E9
| 557329 ||  || — || October 22, 2014 || Mount Lemmon || Mount Lemmon Survey ||  || align=right data-sort-value="0.86" | 860 m || 
|-id=330 bgcolor=#E9E9E9
| 557330 ||  || — || December 4, 2005 || Kitt Peak || Spacewatch ||  || align=right | 2.1 km || 
|-id=331 bgcolor=#E9E9E9
| 557331 ||  || — || October 23, 2014 || Kitt Peak || Spacewatch ||  || align=right | 1.0 km || 
|-id=332 bgcolor=#E9E9E9
| 557332 ||  || — || February 28, 2012 || Haleakala || Pan-STARRS ||  || align=right | 1.8 km || 
|-id=333 bgcolor=#E9E9E9
| 557333 ||  || — || April 27, 2012 || Haleakala || Pan-STARRS ||  || align=right | 1.3 km || 
|-id=334 bgcolor=#C2FFFF
| 557334 ||  || — || October 23, 2014 || Kitt Peak || Spacewatch || L5 || align=right | 7.2 km || 
|-id=335 bgcolor=#E9E9E9
| 557335 ||  || — || February 9, 2008 || Kitt Peak || Spacewatch ||  || align=right | 1.5 km || 
|-id=336 bgcolor=#E9E9E9
| 557336 ||  || — || December 8, 2010 || Mount Lemmon || Mount Lemmon Survey ||  || align=right | 2.2 km || 
|-id=337 bgcolor=#E9E9E9
| 557337 ||  || — || September 11, 2010 || Mount Lemmon || Mount Lemmon Survey ||  || align=right data-sort-value="0.72" | 720 m || 
|-id=338 bgcolor=#E9E9E9
| 557338 ||  || — || August 27, 2000 || Cerro Tololo || R. Millis, L. H. Wasserman ||  || align=right | 2.0 km || 
|-id=339 bgcolor=#E9E9E9
| 557339 ||  || — || November 12, 2001 || Apache Point || SDSS Collaboration ||  || align=right | 1.4 km || 
|-id=340 bgcolor=#d6d6d6
| 557340 ||  || — || September 15, 2006 || Kitt Peak || Spacewatch || 3:2 || align=right | 3.6 km || 
|-id=341 bgcolor=#E9E9E9
| 557341 ||  || — || October 30, 2005 || Mount Lemmon || Mount Lemmon Survey ||  || align=right | 1.7 km || 
|-id=342 bgcolor=#E9E9E9
| 557342 ||  || — || October 27, 2005 || Mount Lemmon || Mount Lemmon Survey ||  || align=right | 1.6 km || 
|-id=343 bgcolor=#d6d6d6
| 557343 ||  || — || September 26, 2014 || Kitt Peak || Spacewatch ||  || align=right | 2.6 km || 
|-id=344 bgcolor=#E9E9E9
| 557344 ||  || — || September 30, 2005 || Mount Lemmon || Mount Lemmon Survey ||  || align=right | 1.5 km || 
|-id=345 bgcolor=#fefefe
| 557345 ||  || — || April 7, 1997 || Kitt Peak || Spacewatch || H || align=right data-sort-value="0.65" | 650 m || 
|-id=346 bgcolor=#E9E9E9
| 557346 ||  || — || September 25, 2014 || Catalina || CSS ||  || align=right | 2.2 km || 
|-id=347 bgcolor=#E9E9E9
| 557347 ||  || — || December 24, 2006 || Kitt Peak || Spacewatch ||  || align=right | 1.5 km || 
|-id=348 bgcolor=#E9E9E9
| 557348 ||  || — || September 14, 2005 || Kitt Peak || Spacewatch ||  || align=right | 1.5 km || 
|-id=349 bgcolor=#E9E9E9
| 557349 ||  || — || October 25, 2014 || Haleakala || Pan-STARRS ||  || align=right | 1.2 km || 
|-id=350 bgcolor=#fefefe
| 557350 ||  || — || April 15, 2013 || Haleakala || Pan-STARRS || H || align=right data-sort-value="0.87" | 870 m || 
|-id=351 bgcolor=#fefefe
| 557351 ||  || — || April 10, 2013 || Haleakala || Pan-STARRS || H || align=right data-sort-value="0.72" | 720 m || 
|-id=352 bgcolor=#E9E9E9
| 557352 ||  || — || March 16, 2012 || Kitt Peak || Spacewatch ||  || align=right | 1.8 km || 
|-id=353 bgcolor=#E9E9E9
| 557353 ||  || — || September 24, 2014 || Mount Lemmon || Mount Lemmon Survey ||  || align=right | 1.2 km || 
|-id=354 bgcolor=#E9E9E9
| 557354 ||  || — || December 18, 2001 || Socorro || LINEAR ||  || align=right | 1.4 km || 
|-id=355 bgcolor=#E9E9E9
| 557355 ||  || — || April 22, 2007 || Mount Lemmon || Mount Lemmon Survey ||  || align=right | 2.7 km || 
|-id=356 bgcolor=#E9E9E9
| 557356 ||  || — || July 31, 2005 || Palomar || NEAT ||  || align=right | 1.6 km || 
|-id=357 bgcolor=#E9E9E9
| 557357 ||  || — || June 18, 2013 || Haleakala || Pan-STARRS ||  || align=right | 1.9 km || 
|-id=358 bgcolor=#d6d6d6
| 557358 ||  || — || October 22, 2014 || Catalina || CSS ||  || align=right | 2.2 km || 
|-id=359 bgcolor=#E9E9E9
| 557359 ||  || — || July 12, 2005 || Mount Lemmon || Mount Lemmon Survey ||  || align=right | 1.3 km || 
|-id=360 bgcolor=#E9E9E9
| 557360 ||  || — || October 1, 2000 || Socorro || LINEAR ||  || align=right | 2.6 km || 
|-id=361 bgcolor=#E9E9E9
| 557361 ||  || — || October 23, 2014 || Kitt Peak || Spacewatch ||  || align=right | 1.3 km || 
|-id=362 bgcolor=#E9E9E9
| 557362 ||  || — || March 11, 2003 || Kitt Peak || Spacewatch ||  || align=right | 1.8 km || 
|-id=363 bgcolor=#E9E9E9
| 557363 ||  || — || September 24, 2014 || Mount Lemmon || Mount Lemmon Survey ||  || align=right data-sort-value="0.68" | 680 m || 
|-id=364 bgcolor=#E9E9E9
| 557364 ||  || — || April 17, 2013 || Haleakala || Pan-STARRS ||  || align=right | 1.0 km || 
|-id=365 bgcolor=#E9E9E9
| 557365 ||  || — || September 29, 2005 || Kitt Peak || Spacewatch ||  || align=right | 1.4 km || 
|-id=366 bgcolor=#E9E9E9
| 557366 ||  || — || September 25, 2014 || Kitt Peak || Spacewatch ||  || align=right | 1.4 km || 
|-id=367 bgcolor=#E9E9E9
| 557367 ||  || — || June 29, 2005 || Kitt Peak || Spacewatch ||  || align=right | 1.0 km || 
|-id=368 bgcolor=#E9E9E9
| 557368 ||  || — || December 7, 2005 || Kitt Peak || Spacewatch ||  || align=right | 1.9 km || 
|-id=369 bgcolor=#E9E9E9
| 557369 ||  || — || August 26, 2005 || Palomar || NEAT ||  || align=right | 1.2 km || 
|-id=370 bgcolor=#E9E9E9
| 557370 ||  || — || September 29, 2005 || Kitt Peak || Spacewatch ||  || align=right | 1.4 km || 
|-id=371 bgcolor=#E9E9E9
| 557371 ||  || — || April 3, 2008 || Kitt Peak || Spacewatch ||  || align=right | 1.7 km || 
|-id=372 bgcolor=#E9E9E9
| 557372 ||  || — || August 17, 2009 || Kitt Peak || Spacewatch ||  || align=right | 1.6 km || 
|-id=373 bgcolor=#E9E9E9
| 557373 ||  || — || October 3, 2014 || Mount Lemmon || Mount Lemmon Survey ||  || align=right | 2.1 km || 
|-id=374 bgcolor=#E9E9E9
| 557374 ||  || — || June 18, 2013 || Haleakala || Pan-STARRS ||  || align=right | 2.1 km || 
|-id=375 bgcolor=#E9E9E9
| 557375 ||  || — || January 28, 2007 || Kitt Peak || Spacewatch ||  || align=right | 2.2 km || 
|-id=376 bgcolor=#E9E9E9
| 557376 ||  || — || November 12, 2005 || Kitt Peak || Spacewatch || PAD || align=right | 1.1 km || 
|-id=377 bgcolor=#E9E9E9
| 557377 ||  || — || September 15, 2009 || Mount Lemmon || Mount Lemmon Survey ||  || align=right | 1.9 km || 
|-id=378 bgcolor=#E9E9E9
| 557378 ||  || — || March 30, 2008 || Kitt Peak || Spacewatch ||  || align=right | 1.4 km || 
|-id=379 bgcolor=#E9E9E9
| 557379 ||  || — || October 7, 2005 || Mount Lemmon || Mount Lemmon Survey ||  || align=right | 1.9 km || 
|-id=380 bgcolor=#E9E9E9
| 557380 ||  || — || April 12, 2013 || Haleakala || Pan-STARRS ||  || align=right | 1.4 km || 
|-id=381 bgcolor=#E9E9E9
| 557381 ||  || — || October 30, 2005 || Kitt Peak || Spacewatch ||  || align=right | 1.7 km || 
|-id=382 bgcolor=#E9E9E9
| 557382 ||  || — || September 23, 2009 || Mount Lemmon || Mount Lemmon Survey ||  || align=right | 1.9 km || 
|-id=383 bgcolor=#E9E9E9
| 557383 ||  || — || October 27, 2005 || Kitt Peak || Spacewatch ||  || align=right | 2.0 km || 
|-id=384 bgcolor=#E9E9E9
| 557384 ||  || — || March 12, 2008 || Mount Lemmon || Mount Lemmon Survey ||  || align=right data-sort-value="0.86" | 860 m || 
|-id=385 bgcolor=#E9E9E9
| 557385 ||  || — || February 28, 2012 || Haleakala || Pan-STARRS ||  || align=right | 1.8 km || 
|-id=386 bgcolor=#E9E9E9
| 557386 ||  || — || March 27, 2008 || Kitt Peak || Spacewatch ||  || align=right | 2.0 km || 
|-id=387 bgcolor=#E9E9E9
| 557387 ||  || — || May 15, 2013 || Haleakala || Pan-STARRS ||  || align=right | 1.1 km || 
|-id=388 bgcolor=#E9E9E9
| 557388 ||  || — || July 28, 2014 || Haleakala || Pan-STARRS ||  || align=right | 1.5 km || 
|-id=389 bgcolor=#d6d6d6
| 557389 ||  || — || April 1, 2011 || Kitt Peak || Spacewatch ||  || align=right | 2.5 km || 
|-id=390 bgcolor=#E9E9E9
| 557390 ||  || — || February 22, 2007 || Kitt Peak || Spacewatch ||  || align=right | 1.1 km || 
|-id=391 bgcolor=#d6d6d6
| 557391 ||  || — || March 4, 2005 || Mount Lemmon || Mount Lemmon Survey ||  || align=right | 2.8 km || 
|-id=392 bgcolor=#E9E9E9
| 557392 ||  || — || December 10, 2010 || Mount Lemmon || Mount Lemmon Survey || AGN || align=right data-sort-value="0.98" | 980 m || 
|-id=393 bgcolor=#E9E9E9
| 557393 ||  || — || March 15, 2012 || Mount Lemmon || Mount Lemmon Survey ||  || align=right | 1.8 km || 
|-id=394 bgcolor=#fefefe
| 557394 ||  || — || May 3, 2005 || Kitt Peak || Spacewatch || H || align=right data-sort-value="0.48" | 480 m || 
|-id=395 bgcolor=#E9E9E9
| 557395 ||  || — || March 9, 2007 || Kitt Peak || Spacewatch ||  || align=right | 1.8 km || 
|-id=396 bgcolor=#E9E9E9
| 557396 ||  || — || March 29, 2012 || Haleakala || Pan-STARRS ||  || align=right | 2.2 km || 
|-id=397 bgcolor=#E9E9E9
| 557397 ||  || — || April 12, 2012 || Haleakala || Pan-STARRS ||  || align=right | 1.9 km || 
|-id=398 bgcolor=#E9E9E9
| 557398 ||  || — || April 19, 2013 || Haleakala || Pan-STARRS ||  || align=right | 1.2 km || 
|-id=399 bgcolor=#E9E9E9
| 557399 ||  || — || November 30, 2010 || Mount Lemmon || Mount Lemmon Survey || (5) || align=right data-sort-value="0.74" | 740 m || 
|-id=400 bgcolor=#E9E9E9
| 557400 ||  || — || April 29, 2008 || Mount Lemmon || Mount Lemmon Survey ||  || align=right | 2.2 km || 
|}

557401–557500 

|-bgcolor=#E9E9E9
| 557401 ||  || — || August 31, 2014 || Haleakala || Pan-STARRS ||  || align=right | 1.1 km || 
|-id=402 bgcolor=#E9E9E9
| 557402 ||  || — || December 1, 2005 || Mount Lemmon || Mount Lemmon Survey ||  || align=right | 2.0 km || 
|-id=403 bgcolor=#E9E9E9
| 557403 ||  || — || September 25, 2005 || Kitt Peak || Spacewatch ||  || align=right | 1.8 km || 
|-id=404 bgcolor=#E9E9E9
| 557404 ||  || — || December 2, 2010 || Mount Lemmon || Mount Lemmon Survey ||  || align=right | 1.2 km || 
|-id=405 bgcolor=#d6d6d6
| 557405 ||  || — || October 25, 2014 || Haleakala || Pan-STARRS ||  || align=right | 1.8 km || 
|-id=406 bgcolor=#fefefe
| 557406 ||  || — || October 20, 2003 || Palomar || NEAT || H || align=right data-sort-value="0.67" | 670 m || 
|-id=407 bgcolor=#fefefe
| 557407 ||  || — || October 18, 2014 || Nogales || M. Schwartz, P. R. Holvorcem || H || align=right data-sort-value="0.62" | 620 m || 
|-id=408 bgcolor=#E9E9E9
| 557408 ||  || — || March 13, 2012 || Mount Lemmon || Mount Lemmon Survey ||  || align=right | 2.1 km || 
|-id=409 bgcolor=#E9E9E9
| 557409 ||  || — || August 16, 2009 || Kitt Peak || Spacewatch ||  || align=right | 1.9 km || 
|-id=410 bgcolor=#E9E9E9
| 557410 ||  || — || December 2, 2010 || Catalina || CSS ||  || align=right | 1.2 km || 
|-id=411 bgcolor=#E9E9E9
| 557411 ||  || — || November 17, 2006 || Mount Lemmon || Mount Lemmon Survey ||  || align=right data-sort-value="0.69" | 690 m || 
|-id=412 bgcolor=#E9E9E9
| 557412 ||  || — || October 28, 2014 || Mount Lemmon || Mount Lemmon Survey ||  || align=right | 1.4 km || 
|-id=413 bgcolor=#E9E9E9
| 557413 ||  || — || November 1, 2005 || Mount Lemmon || Mount Lemmon Survey ||  || align=right | 2.2 km || 
|-id=414 bgcolor=#E9E9E9
| 557414 ||  || — || April 25, 2008 || Kitt Peak || Spacewatch ||  || align=right | 2.4 km || 
|-id=415 bgcolor=#E9E9E9
| 557415 ||  || — || March 26, 2003 || Palomar || NEAT ||  || align=right | 2.8 km || 
|-id=416 bgcolor=#d6d6d6
| 557416 ||  || — || October 8, 2008 || Kitt Peak || Spacewatch ||  || align=right | 2.3 km || 
|-id=417 bgcolor=#E9E9E9
| 557417 ||  || — || May 30, 2003 || Cerro Tololo || M. W. Buie, K. J. Meech ||  || align=right | 1.9 km || 
|-id=418 bgcolor=#E9E9E9
| 557418 ||  || — || March 29, 2008 || Mount Lemmon || Mount Lemmon Survey ||  || align=right | 1.3 km || 
|-id=419 bgcolor=#E9E9E9
| 557419 ||  || — || March 15, 2007 || Mount Lemmon || Mount Lemmon Survey ||  || align=right | 2.0 km || 
|-id=420 bgcolor=#E9E9E9
| 557420 ||  || — || October 2, 2014 || Haleakala || Pan-STARRS ||  || align=right | 1.2 km || 
|-id=421 bgcolor=#E9E9E9
| 557421 ||  || — || January 10, 2007 || Mount Lemmon || Mount Lemmon Survey ||  || align=right | 1.2 km || 
|-id=422 bgcolor=#E9E9E9
| 557422 ||  || — || October 18, 2014 || Kitt Peak || Spacewatch ||  || align=right | 1.9 km || 
|-id=423 bgcolor=#E9E9E9
| 557423 ||  || — || October 25, 2005 || Mount Lemmon || Mount Lemmon Survey ||  || align=right | 1.6 km || 
|-id=424 bgcolor=#fefefe
| 557424 ||  || — || March 7, 2013 || Haleakala || Pan-STARRS || H || align=right data-sort-value="0.72" | 720 m || 
|-id=425 bgcolor=#E9E9E9
| 557425 ||  || — || November 12, 2010 || Kitt Peak || Spacewatch ||  || align=right | 1.5 km || 
|-id=426 bgcolor=#E9E9E9
| 557426 ||  || — || November 26, 2005 || Mount Lemmon || Mount Lemmon Survey ||  || align=right | 1.7 km || 
|-id=427 bgcolor=#E9E9E9
| 557427 ||  || — || August 28, 2009 || Kitt Peak || Spacewatch ||  || align=right | 1.8 km || 
|-id=428 bgcolor=#E9E9E9
| 557428 ||  || — || January 29, 2003 || Apache Point || SDSS Collaboration ||  || align=right | 1.5 km || 
|-id=429 bgcolor=#E9E9E9
| 557429 ||  || — || January 4, 2011 || Mount Lemmon || Mount Lemmon Survey ||  || align=right | 1.4 km || 
|-id=430 bgcolor=#E9E9E9
| 557430 ||  || — || September 30, 2005 || Mount Lemmon || Mount Lemmon Survey ||  || align=right | 1.3 km || 
|-id=431 bgcolor=#E9E9E9
| 557431 ||  || — || April 15, 2008 || Mount Lemmon || Mount Lemmon Survey ||  || align=right | 1.3 km || 
|-id=432 bgcolor=#d6d6d6
| 557432 ||  || — || March 14, 2011 || Mount Lemmon || Mount Lemmon Survey ||  || align=right | 2.0 km || 
|-id=433 bgcolor=#fefefe
| 557433 ||  || — || November 21, 2003 || Socorro || LINEAR || H || align=right data-sort-value="0.77" | 770 m || 
|-id=434 bgcolor=#d6d6d6
| 557434 ||  || — || September 27, 2006 || Kitt Peak || Spacewatch || 3:2 || align=right | 3.4 km || 
|-id=435 bgcolor=#E9E9E9
| 557435 ||  || — || December 9, 2010 || Kitt Peak || Spacewatch ||  || align=right | 1.2 km || 
|-id=436 bgcolor=#E9E9E9
| 557436 ||  || — || October 22, 2005 || Kitt Peak || Spacewatch ||  || align=right | 1.8 km || 
|-id=437 bgcolor=#E9E9E9
| 557437 ||  || — || September 24, 2014 || Kitt Peak || Spacewatch ||  || align=right | 1.5 km || 
|-id=438 bgcolor=#fefefe
| 557438 ||  || — || June 5, 2013 || Kitt Peak || Spacewatch ||  || align=right | 1.0 km || 
|-id=439 bgcolor=#E9E9E9
| 557439 ||  || — || August 12, 2001 || Palomar || NEAT || EUN || align=right | 1.3 km || 
|-id=440 bgcolor=#E9E9E9
| 557440 ||  || — || October 25, 2014 || Kitt Peak || Pan-STARRS || PAD || align=right | 1.7 km || 
|-id=441 bgcolor=#E9E9E9
| 557441 ||  || — || August 1, 2009 || Kitt Peak || Spacewatch ||  || align=right | 1.7 km || 
|-id=442 bgcolor=#E9E9E9
| 557442 ||  || — || November 10, 2005 || Mount Lemmon || Mount Lemmon Survey ||  || align=right | 2.2 km || 
|-id=443 bgcolor=#FA8072
| 557443 ||  || — || March 19, 2010 || Catalina || CSS || Tj (2.91) || align=right | 2.0 km || 
|-id=444 bgcolor=#E9E9E9
| 557444 ||  || — || March 14, 2012 || Kitt Peak || Spacewatch ||  || align=right | 1.9 km || 
|-id=445 bgcolor=#E9E9E9
| 557445 ||  || — || December 12, 2006 || Mount Lemmon || Mount Lemmon Survey ||  || align=right | 1.8 km || 
|-id=446 bgcolor=#E9E9E9
| 557446 ||  || — || October 16, 2001 || Kitt Peak || Spacewatch ||  || align=right | 1.1 km || 
|-id=447 bgcolor=#E9E9E9
| 557447 ||  || — || February 7, 2011 || Mount Lemmon || Mount Lemmon Survey ||  || align=right | 2.0 km || 
|-id=448 bgcolor=#E9E9E9
| 557448 ||  || — || February 28, 2012 || Haleakala || Pan-STARRS ||  || align=right | 1.4 km || 
|-id=449 bgcolor=#E9E9E9
| 557449 ||  || — || April 20, 2012 || Mount Lemmon || Mount Lemmon Survey ||  || align=right | 1.7 km || 
|-id=450 bgcolor=#E9E9E9
| 557450 ||  || — || February 28, 2012 || Haleakala || Pan-STARRS ||  || align=right | 1.6 km || 
|-id=451 bgcolor=#E9E9E9
| 557451 ||  || — || April 13, 2013 || ESA OGS || ESA OGS ||  || align=right | 2.1 km || 
|-id=452 bgcolor=#d6d6d6
| 557452 ||  || — || April 22, 2013 || Mount Lemmon || Mount Lemmon Survey ||  || align=right | 2.9 km || 
|-id=453 bgcolor=#d6d6d6
| 557453 ||  || — || November 18, 2003 || Kitt Peak || Spacewatch ||  || align=right | 3.1 km || 
|-id=454 bgcolor=#E9E9E9
| 557454 ||  || — || November 12, 2001 || Apache Point || SDSS Collaboration ||  || align=right | 2.1 km || 
|-id=455 bgcolor=#E9E9E9
| 557455 ||  || — || March 16, 2012 || Kitt Peak || Spacewatch ||  || align=right | 2.2 km || 
|-id=456 bgcolor=#E9E9E9
| 557456 ||  || — || September 2, 2014 || Haleakala || Pan-STARRS ||  || align=right | 1.3 km || 
|-id=457 bgcolor=#d6d6d6
| 557457 ||  || — || September 6, 2008 || Mount Lemmon || Mount Lemmon Survey ||  || align=right | 2.3 km || 
|-id=458 bgcolor=#E9E9E9
| 557458 ||  || — || October 7, 2014 || Haleakala || Pan-STARRS ||  || align=right | 1.5 km || 
|-id=459 bgcolor=#E9E9E9
| 557459 ||  || — || September 25, 2014 || Catalina || CSS ||  || align=right | 2.9 km || 
|-id=460 bgcolor=#d6d6d6
| 557460 ||  || — || February 2, 2005 || Kitt Peak || Spacewatch ||  || align=right | 3.3 km || 
|-id=461 bgcolor=#E9E9E9
| 557461 ||  || — || October 1, 2005 || Catalina || CSS ||  || align=right | 1.8 km || 
|-id=462 bgcolor=#E9E9E9
| 557462 ||  || — || November 27, 2010 || Mount Lemmon || Mount Lemmon Survey ||  || align=right | 1.3 km || 
|-id=463 bgcolor=#E9E9E9
| 557463 ||  || — || May 8, 2013 || Haleakala || Pan-STARRS ||  || align=right | 1.3 km || 
|-id=464 bgcolor=#FA8072
| 557464 ||  || — || November 19, 2000 || Socorro || LINEAR || H || align=right data-sort-value="0.79" | 790 m || 
|-id=465 bgcolor=#E9E9E9
| 557465 ||  || — || October 12, 2001 || Haleakala || AMOS || ADE || align=right | 2.3 km || 
|-id=466 bgcolor=#d6d6d6
| 557466 ||  || — || September 28, 2003 || Anderson Mesa || LONEOS ||  || align=right | 3.2 km || 
|-id=467 bgcolor=#E9E9E9
| 557467 ||  || — || October 13, 2014 || Mount Lemmon || Mount Lemmon Survey ||  || align=right | 1.1 km || 
|-id=468 bgcolor=#d6d6d6
| 557468 ||  || — || October 30, 2014 || Haleakala || Pan-STARRS ||  || align=right | 2.6 km || 
|-id=469 bgcolor=#E9E9E9
| 557469 ||  || — || April 4, 2008 || Mount Lemmon || Mount Lemmon Survey ||  || align=right | 2.0 km || 
|-id=470 bgcolor=#d6d6d6
| 557470 ||  || — || September 20, 2008 || Mount Lemmon || Mount Lemmon Survey ||  || align=right | 1.9 km || 
|-id=471 bgcolor=#d6d6d6
| 557471 ||  || — || October 22, 2003 || Kitt Peak || Spacewatch ||  || align=right | 2.2 km || 
|-id=472 bgcolor=#d6d6d6
| 557472 ||  || — || October 12, 2009 || Mount Lemmon || Mount Lemmon Survey ||  || align=right | 1.7 km || 
|-id=473 bgcolor=#E9E9E9
| 557473 ||  || — || November 8, 2010 || Kitt Peak || Spacewatch ||  || align=right | 1.6 km || 
|-id=474 bgcolor=#E9E9E9
| 557474 ||  || — || December 11, 2001 || Kitt Peak || Spacewatch ||  || align=right | 2.2 km || 
|-id=475 bgcolor=#E9E9E9
| 557475 ||  || — || October 17, 2014 || Kitt Peak || Spacewatch ||  || align=right | 1.8 km || 
|-id=476 bgcolor=#E9E9E9
| 557476 ||  || — || October 18, 2014 || Nogales || M. Schwartz, P. R. Holvorcem ||  || align=right data-sort-value="0.89" | 890 m || 
|-id=477 bgcolor=#E9E9E9
| 557477 ||  || — || August 27, 2009 || Kitt Peak || Spacewatch ||  || align=right | 2.3 km || 
|-id=478 bgcolor=#E9E9E9
| 557478 ||  || — || December 14, 2010 || Mount Lemmon || Mount Lemmon Survey ||  || align=right | 1.7 km || 
|-id=479 bgcolor=#E9E9E9
| 557479 ||  || — || October 22, 2014 || Kitt Peak || Spacewatch ||  || align=right | 1.1 km || 
|-id=480 bgcolor=#d6d6d6
| 557480 ||  || — || October 22, 2014 || Mount Lemmon || Mount Lemmon Survey ||  || align=right | 1.8 km || 
|-id=481 bgcolor=#E9E9E9
| 557481 ||  || — || October 23, 2014 || Kitt Peak || Spacewatch ||  || align=right | 1.1 km || 
|-id=482 bgcolor=#E9E9E9
| 557482 ||  || — || October 25, 2014 || Mount Lemmon || Mount Lemmon Survey ||  || align=right | 1.0 km || 
|-id=483 bgcolor=#d6d6d6
| 557483 ||  || — || October 25, 2014 || Haleakala || Pan-STARRS ||  || align=right | 1.7 km || 
|-id=484 bgcolor=#E9E9E9
| 557484 ||  || — || January 27, 2007 || Kitt Peak || Spacewatch ||  || align=right | 1.4 km || 
|-id=485 bgcolor=#d6d6d6
| 557485 ||  || — || October 25, 2014 || Haleakala || Pan-STARRS ||  || align=right | 2.0 km || 
|-id=486 bgcolor=#d6d6d6
| 557486 ||  || — || March 2, 2006 || Kitt Peak || Spacewatch ||  || align=right | 3.4 km || 
|-id=487 bgcolor=#E9E9E9
| 557487 ||  || — || October 26, 2014 || Haleakala || Pan-STARRS ||  || align=right | 1.5 km || 
|-id=488 bgcolor=#E9E9E9
| 557488 ||  || — || September 22, 2009 || Kitt Peak || Spacewatch ||  || align=right | 1.7 km || 
|-id=489 bgcolor=#E9E9E9
| 557489 ||  || — || November 4, 2005 || Mount Lemmon || Mount Lemmon Survey ||  || align=right | 1.9 km || 
|-id=490 bgcolor=#d6d6d6
| 557490 ||  || — || August 3, 2013 || Haleakala || Pan-STARRS ||  || align=right | 1.9 km || 
|-id=491 bgcolor=#E9E9E9
| 557491 ||  || — || October 28, 2014 || Mount Lemmon || Mount Lemmon Survey ||  || align=right | 1.5 km || 
|-id=492 bgcolor=#E9E9E9
| 557492 ||  || — || October 28, 2014 || Haleakala || Pan-STARRS ||  || align=right | 1.1 km || 
|-id=493 bgcolor=#E9E9E9
| 557493 ||  || — || October 29, 2014 || Haleakala || Pan-STARRS ||  || align=right | 1.4 km || 
|-id=494 bgcolor=#E9E9E9
| 557494 ||  || — || October 29, 2014 || Haleakala || Pan-STARRS ||  || align=right | 1.1 km || 
|-id=495 bgcolor=#d6d6d6
| 557495 ||  || — || October 29, 2014 || Haleakala || Pan-STARRS ||  || align=right | 2.0 km || 
|-id=496 bgcolor=#E9E9E9
| 557496 ||  || — || January 14, 2011 || Mount Lemmon || Mount Lemmon Survey ||  || align=right | 1.9 km || 
|-id=497 bgcolor=#E9E9E9
| 557497 ||  || — || October 29, 2014 || Haleakala || Pan-STARRS ||  || align=right | 1.2 km || 
|-id=498 bgcolor=#E9E9E9
| 557498 ||  || — || September 12, 2005 || Kitt Peak || Spacewatch ||  || align=right | 1.2 km || 
|-id=499 bgcolor=#E9E9E9
| 557499 ||  || — || October 24, 2014 || Mount Lemmon || Mount Lemmon Survey ||  || align=right data-sort-value="0.64" | 640 m || 
|-id=500 bgcolor=#d6d6d6
| 557500 ||  || — || October 26, 2014 || Mount Lemmon || Mount Lemmon Survey ||  || align=right | 1.6 km || 
|}

557501–557600 

|-bgcolor=#d6d6d6
| 557501 ||  || — || July 29, 2008 || Kitt Peak || Spacewatch ||  || align=right | 2.7 km || 
|-id=502 bgcolor=#E9E9E9
| 557502 ||  || — || October 29, 2014 || Haleakala || Pan-STARRS ||  || align=right | 1.2 km || 
|-id=503 bgcolor=#E9E9E9
| 557503 ||  || — || October 22, 2014 || Mount Lemmon || Mount Lemmon Survey ||  || align=right | 1.1 km || 
|-id=504 bgcolor=#d6d6d6
| 557504 ||  || — || October 28, 2014 || Haleakala || Pan-STARRS ||  || align=right | 2.4 km || 
|-id=505 bgcolor=#E9E9E9
| 557505 ||  || — || October 18, 2014 || Mount Lemmon || Mount Lemmon Survey ||  || align=right data-sort-value="0.63" | 630 m || 
|-id=506 bgcolor=#d6d6d6
| 557506 ||  || — || October 30, 2014 || Mount Lemmon || Mount Lemmon Survey ||  || align=right | 2.4 km || 
|-id=507 bgcolor=#E9E9E9
| 557507 ||  || — || March 31, 2008 || Mount Lemmon || Mount Lemmon Survey ||  || align=right | 2.0 km || 
|-id=508 bgcolor=#d6d6d6
| 557508 ||  || — || October 21, 2002 || Palomar || NEAT || Tj (2.96) || align=right | 3.2 km || 
|-id=509 bgcolor=#fefefe
| 557509 ||  || — || January 11, 2008 || Kitt Peak || Spacewatch ||  || align=right data-sort-value="0.81" | 810 m || 
|-id=510 bgcolor=#fefefe
| 557510 ||  || — || March 18, 2013 || Palomar || PTF || H || align=right data-sort-value="0.78" | 780 m || 
|-id=511 bgcolor=#d6d6d6
| 557511 ||  || — || March 26, 2011 || Kitt Peak || Spacewatch ||  || align=right | 2.4 km || 
|-id=512 bgcolor=#d6d6d6
| 557512 ||  || — || September 21, 2003 || Palomar || NEAT ||  || align=right | 3.0 km || 
|-id=513 bgcolor=#E9E9E9
| 557513 ||  || — || August 6, 2014 || Haleakala || Pan-STARRS ||  || align=right | 1.9 km || 
|-id=514 bgcolor=#E9E9E9
| 557514 ||  || — || October 2, 2014 || Haleakala || Pan-STARRS ||  || align=right | 1.9 km || 
|-id=515 bgcolor=#E9E9E9
| 557515 ||  || — || September 21, 2001 || Apache Point || SDSS Collaboration ||  || align=right | 1.2 km || 
|-id=516 bgcolor=#E9E9E9
| 557516 ||  || — || September 24, 2014 || Kitt Peak || Spacewatch ||  || align=right | 1.3 km || 
|-id=517 bgcolor=#E9E9E9
| 557517 ||  || — || May 12, 2012 || Mount Lemmon || Mount Lemmon Survey ||  || align=right | 2.1 km || 
|-id=518 bgcolor=#fefefe
| 557518 ||  || — || March 11, 2005 || Catalina || CSS || H || align=right data-sort-value="0.59" | 590 m || 
|-id=519 bgcolor=#fefefe
| 557519 ||  || — || March 25, 2003 || Haleakala || AMOS || H || align=right data-sort-value="0.66" | 660 m || 
|-id=520 bgcolor=#fefefe
| 557520 ||  || — || October 22, 2014 || Mount Lemmon || Mount Lemmon Survey || H || align=right data-sort-value="0.62" | 620 m || 
|-id=521 bgcolor=#E9E9E9
| 557521 ||  || — || November 12, 2014 || Haleakala || Pan-STARRS ||  || align=right | 1.3 km || 
|-id=522 bgcolor=#d6d6d6
| 557522 ||  || — || November 12, 2014 || Haleakala || Pan-STARRS ||  || align=right | 2.0 km || 
|-id=523 bgcolor=#E9E9E9
| 557523 ||  || — || September 18, 2014 || Kitt Peak || Pan-STARRS ||  || align=right | 2.0 km || 
|-id=524 bgcolor=#E9E9E9
| 557524 ||  || — || October 21, 2014 || Oukaimeden || M. Ory ||  || align=right | 2.3 km || 
|-id=525 bgcolor=#E9E9E9
| 557525 ||  || — || October 15, 2001 || Palomar || NEAT ||  || align=right | 1.2 km || 
|-id=526 bgcolor=#E9E9E9
| 557526 ||  || — || October 7, 2014 || Haleakala || Pan-STARRS ||  || align=right | 1.5 km || 
|-id=527 bgcolor=#E9E9E9
| 557527 ||  || — || December 3, 2010 || Mount Lemmon || Mount Lemmon Survey ||  || align=right data-sort-value="0.71" | 710 m || 
|-id=528 bgcolor=#d6d6d6
| 557528 ||  || — || November 17, 2009 || Kitt Peak || Spacewatch ||  || align=right | 2.0 km || 
|-id=529 bgcolor=#d6d6d6
| 557529 ||  || — || November 24, 2003 || Socorro || LINEAR ||  || align=right | 2.3 km || 
|-id=530 bgcolor=#E9E9E9
| 557530 ||  || — || September 30, 2005 || Mount Lemmon || Mount Lemmon Survey ||  || align=right | 1.1 km || 
|-id=531 bgcolor=#d6d6d6
| 557531 ||  || — || October 23, 2014 || Kitt Peak || Spacewatch ||  || align=right | 2.4 km || 
|-id=532 bgcolor=#E9E9E9
| 557532 ||  || — || October 26, 2005 || Kitt Peak || Spacewatch ||  || align=right | 1.2 km || 
|-id=533 bgcolor=#fefefe
| 557533 ||  || — || November 12, 2014 || Haleakala || Pan-STARRS || H || align=right data-sort-value="0.62" | 620 m || 
|-id=534 bgcolor=#E9E9E9
| 557534 ||  || — || September 20, 2009 || Kitt Peak || Spacewatch ||  || align=right | 1.7 km || 
|-id=535 bgcolor=#E9E9E9
| 557535 ||  || — || September 28, 2009 || Mount Lemmon || Mount Lemmon Survey ||  || align=right | 1.7 km || 
|-id=536 bgcolor=#E9E9E9
| 557536 ||  || — || November 12, 2014 || Haleakala || Pan-STARRS ||  || align=right | 1.1 km || 
|-id=537 bgcolor=#E9E9E9
| 557537 ||  || — || April 7, 2007 || Bergisch Gladbach || W. Bickel ||  || align=right | 2.5 km || 
|-id=538 bgcolor=#d6d6d6
| 557538 ||  || — || November 14, 2014 || Kitt Peak || Spacewatch ||  || align=right | 2.1 km || 
|-id=539 bgcolor=#d6d6d6
| 557539 ||  || — || May 31, 2012 || Mount Lemmon || Mount Lemmon Survey ||  || align=right | 2.5 km || 
|-id=540 bgcolor=#d6d6d6
| 557540 ||  || — || September 28, 2009 || Kitt Peak || Spacewatch ||  || align=right | 3.2 km || 
|-id=541 bgcolor=#d6d6d6
| 557541 ||  || — || January 6, 2010 || Mount Lemmon || Mount Lemmon Survey ||  || align=right | 2.0 km || 
|-id=542 bgcolor=#E9E9E9
| 557542 ||  || — || November 3, 2014 || Mount Lemmon || Mount Lemmon Survey ||  || align=right | 2.4 km || 
|-id=543 bgcolor=#E9E9E9
| 557543 ||  || — || November 12, 2014 || Haleakala || Pan-STARRS ||  || align=right | 1.4 km || 
|-id=544 bgcolor=#E9E9E9
| 557544 ||  || — || November 8, 2010 || Mount Lemmon || Mount Lemmon Survey ||  || align=right data-sort-value="0.72" | 720 m || 
|-id=545 bgcolor=#d6d6d6
| 557545 ||  || — || October 8, 2004 || Kitt Peak || Spacewatch ||  || align=right | 2.3 km || 
|-id=546 bgcolor=#C2FFFF
| 557546 ||  || — || October 4, 2013 || Mount Lemmon || Mount Lemmon Survey || L5 || align=right | 7.1 km || 
|-id=547 bgcolor=#FA8072
| 557547 ||  || — || April 9, 2010 || Crni Vrh || J. Vales || H || align=right data-sort-value="0.82" | 820 m || 
|-id=548 bgcolor=#C2FFFF
| 557548 ||  || — || March 31, 2008 || Mount Lemmon || Mount Lemmon Survey || L5 || align=right | 11 km || 
|-id=549 bgcolor=#fefefe
| 557549 ||  || — || April 5, 2013 || Palomar || PTF || H || align=right data-sort-value="0.71" | 710 m || 
|-id=550 bgcolor=#E9E9E9
| 557550 ||  || — || September 24, 2014 || Mount Lemmon || Mount Lemmon Survey ||  || align=right | 2.0 km || 
|-id=551 bgcolor=#E9E9E9
| 557551 ||  || — || December 14, 2010 || Mount Lemmon || Mount Lemmon Survey ||  || align=right | 1.6 km || 
|-id=552 bgcolor=#E9E9E9
| 557552 ||  || — || August 29, 2009 || Kitt Peak || Spacewatch ||  || align=right | 1.8 km || 
|-id=553 bgcolor=#d6d6d6
| 557553 ||  || — || October 25, 2014 || Haleakala || Pan-STARRS ||  || align=right | 2.1 km || 
|-id=554 bgcolor=#E9E9E9
| 557554 ||  || — || December 10, 2010 || Mount Lemmon || Mount Lemmon Survey ||  || align=right | 1.8 km || 
|-id=555 bgcolor=#E9E9E9
| 557555 ||  || — || October 29, 2014 || Kitt Peak || Spacewatch ||  || align=right data-sort-value="0.87" | 870 m || 
|-id=556 bgcolor=#E9E9E9
| 557556 ||  || — || August 31, 2014 || Haleakala || Pan-STARRS ||  || align=right | 2.1 km || 
|-id=557 bgcolor=#E9E9E9
| 557557 ||  || — || May 8, 2013 || Haleakala || Pan-STARRS ||  || align=right data-sort-value="0.86" | 860 m || 
|-id=558 bgcolor=#d6d6d6
| 557558 ||  || — || February 8, 2011 || Mount Lemmon || Mount Lemmon Survey ||  || align=right | 1.7 km || 
|-id=559 bgcolor=#E9E9E9
| 557559 ||  || — || November 4, 2014 || Mount Lemmon || Mount Lemmon Survey ||  || align=right data-sort-value="0.80" | 800 m || 
|-id=560 bgcolor=#E9E9E9
| 557560 ||  || — || July 16, 2013 || Haleakala || Pan-STARRS ||  || align=right | 1.7 km || 
|-id=561 bgcolor=#d6d6d6
| 557561 ||  || — || May 1, 2011 || Mount Lemmon || Mount Lemmon Survey ||  || align=right | 2.3 km || 
|-id=562 bgcolor=#E9E9E9
| 557562 ||  || — || January 8, 2011 || Mount Lemmon || Mount Lemmon Survey ||  || align=right | 1.9 km || 
|-id=563 bgcolor=#E9E9E9
| 557563 ||  || — || February 9, 2002 || Kitt Peak || Spacewatch ||  || align=right | 1.9 km || 
|-id=564 bgcolor=#E9E9E9
| 557564 ||  || — || October 27, 2005 || Kitt Peak || Spacewatch ||  || align=right | 2.0 km || 
|-id=565 bgcolor=#E9E9E9
| 557565 ||  || — || February 8, 2011 || Mount Lemmon || Mount Lemmon Survey ||  || align=right | 1.8 km || 
|-id=566 bgcolor=#E9E9E9
| 557566 ||  || — || September 15, 2009 || Kitt Peak || Spacewatch ||  || align=right | 2.0 km || 
|-id=567 bgcolor=#d6d6d6
| 557567 ||  || — || October 22, 2014 || Mount Lemmon || Mount Lemmon Survey ||  || align=right | 2.1 km || 
|-id=568 bgcolor=#E9E9E9
| 557568 ||  || — || October 22, 2014 || Mount Lemmon || Mount Lemmon Survey ||  || align=right | 1.2 km || 
|-id=569 bgcolor=#E9E9E9
| 557569 ||  || — || October 24, 2005 || Kitt Peak || Spacewatch ||  || align=right | 2.2 km || 
|-id=570 bgcolor=#E9E9E9
| 557570 ||  || — || December 7, 2005 || Kitt Peak || Spacewatch ||  || align=right | 2.1 km || 
|-id=571 bgcolor=#E9E9E9
| 557571 ||  || — || December 8, 2005 || Kitt Peak || Spacewatch ||  || align=right | 1.6 km || 
|-id=572 bgcolor=#E9E9E9
| 557572 ||  || — || October 14, 2010 || Mount Lemmon || Mount Lemmon Survey ||  || align=right | 1.6 km || 
|-id=573 bgcolor=#E9E9E9
| 557573 ||  || — || October 28, 2014 || Haleakala || Pan-STARRS ||  || align=right | 1.6 km || 
|-id=574 bgcolor=#E9E9E9
| 557574 ||  || — || April 21, 2012 || Kitt Peak || Spacewatch ||  || align=right | 1.5 km || 
|-id=575 bgcolor=#E9E9E9
| 557575 ||  || — || October 21, 2001 || Socorro || LINEAR ||  || align=right | 1.5 km || 
|-id=576 bgcolor=#E9E9E9
| 557576 ||  || — || July 13, 2013 || Haleakala || Pan-STARRS ||  || align=right | 1.7 km || 
|-id=577 bgcolor=#E9E9E9
| 557577 ||  || — || October 4, 2014 || Mount Lemmon || Mount Lemmon Survey ||  || align=right | 1.5 km || 
|-id=578 bgcolor=#E9E9E9
| 557578 ||  || — || November 10, 2005 || Kitt Peak || Spacewatch ||  || align=right | 2.0 km || 
|-id=579 bgcolor=#d6d6d6
| 557579 ||  || — || November 17, 2014 || Haleakala || Pan-STARRS ||  || align=right | 2.1 km || 
|-id=580 bgcolor=#E9E9E9
| 557580 ||  || — || September 26, 2009 || Kitt Peak || Spacewatch ||  || align=right | 1.6 km || 
|-id=581 bgcolor=#E9E9E9
| 557581 ||  || — || November 25, 2005 || Kitt Peak || Spacewatch ||  || align=right | 1.7 km || 
|-id=582 bgcolor=#E9E9E9
| 557582 ||  || — || October 19, 2014 || Kitt Peak || Spacewatch ||  || align=right | 1.2 km || 
|-id=583 bgcolor=#E9E9E9
| 557583 ||  || — || November 17, 2014 || Haleakala || Pan-STARRS ||  || align=right | 1.5 km || 
|-id=584 bgcolor=#E9E9E9
| 557584 ||  || — || January 29, 2011 || Mount Lemmon || Mount Lemmon Survey ||  || align=right | 1.5 km || 
|-id=585 bgcolor=#E9E9E9
| 557585 ||  || — || September 21, 2009 || Mount Lemmon || Mount Lemmon Survey ||  || align=right | 1.9 km || 
|-id=586 bgcolor=#d6d6d6
| 557586 ||  || — || April 25, 2007 || Mount Lemmon || Mount Lemmon Survey ||  || align=right | 2.1 km || 
|-id=587 bgcolor=#E9E9E9
| 557587 ||  || — || November 17, 2014 || Haleakala || Pan-STARRS ||  || align=right data-sort-value="0.79" | 790 m || 
|-id=588 bgcolor=#d6d6d6
| 557588 ||  || — || May 15, 2012 || Haleakala || Pan-STARRS ||  || align=right | 3.7 km || 
|-id=589 bgcolor=#E9E9E9
| 557589 ||  || — || January 29, 2011 || Mount Lemmon || Mount Lemmon Survey ||  || align=right | 1.2 km || 
|-id=590 bgcolor=#E9E9E9
| 557590 ||  || — || October 14, 2001 || Apache Point || SDSS Collaboration ||  || align=right | 1.3 km || 
|-id=591 bgcolor=#E9E9E9
| 557591 ||  || — || January 24, 2011 || Mount Lemmon || Mount Lemmon Survey ||  || align=right | 1.7 km || 
|-id=592 bgcolor=#E9E9E9
| 557592 ||  || — || April 1, 2003 || Kitt Peak || M. W. Buie, A. B. Jordan ||  || align=right | 1.9 km || 
|-id=593 bgcolor=#d6d6d6
| 557593 ||  || — || March 26, 2011 || Haleakala || Pan-STARRS ||  || align=right | 3.6 km || 
|-id=594 bgcolor=#E9E9E9
| 557594 ||  || — || March 12, 2008 || Kitt Peak || Spacewatch ||  || align=right | 1.7 km || 
|-id=595 bgcolor=#d6d6d6
| 557595 ||  || — || November 17, 2014 || Haleakala || Pan-STARRS ||  || align=right | 2.2 km || 
|-id=596 bgcolor=#C2FFFF
| 557596 ||  || — || April 7, 2008 || Kitt Peak || Spacewatch || L5 || align=right | 7.6 km || 
|-id=597 bgcolor=#E9E9E9
| 557597 ||  || — || October 26, 2005 || Kitt Peak || Spacewatch ||  || align=right | 1.7 km || 
|-id=598 bgcolor=#d6d6d6
| 557598 ||  || — || November 17, 2014 || Haleakala || Pan-STARRS ||  || align=right | 2.6 km || 
|-id=599 bgcolor=#E9E9E9
| 557599 ||  || — || November 17, 2014 || Kitt Peak || Pan-STARRS ||  || align=right data-sort-value="0.90" | 900 m || 
|-id=600 bgcolor=#d6d6d6
| 557600 ||  || — || November 4, 2014 || Mount Lemmon || Mount Lemmon Survey ||  || align=right | 1.9 km || 
|}

557601–557700 

|-bgcolor=#d6d6d6
| 557601 ||  || — || October 8, 2008 || Mount Lemmon || Mount Lemmon Survey ||  || align=right | 2.2 km || 
|-id=602 bgcolor=#E9E9E9
| 557602 ||  || — || October 18, 2009 || Mount Lemmon || Mount Lemmon Survey ||  || align=right | 1.7 km || 
|-id=603 bgcolor=#E9E9E9
| 557603 ||  || — || November 22, 2005 || Kitt Peak || Spacewatch ||  || align=right | 2.2 km || 
|-id=604 bgcolor=#E9E9E9
| 557604 ||  || — || November 1, 2010 || Kitt Peak || Spacewatch ||  || align=right data-sort-value="0.87" | 870 m || 
|-id=605 bgcolor=#E9E9E9
| 557605 ||  || — || November 28, 2005 || Mount Lemmon || Mount Lemmon Survey ||  || align=right | 1.5 km || 
|-id=606 bgcolor=#E9E9E9
| 557606 ||  || — || October 5, 2005 || Kitt Peak || Spacewatch ||  || align=right | 1.1 km || 
|-id=607 bgcolor=#d6d6d6
| 557607 ||  || — || November 8, 2009 || Mount Lemmon || Mount Lemmon Survey ||  || align=right | 1.6 km || 
|-id=608 bgcolor=#E9E9E9
| 557608 ||  || — || January 29, 2011 || Mount Lemmon || Mount Lemmon Survey ||  || align=right | 1.6 km || 
|-id=609 bgcolor=#E9E9E9
| 557609 ||  || — || November 17, 2014 || Haleakala || Pan-STARRS ||  || align=right | 1.9 km || 
|-id=610 bgcolor=#E9E9E9
| 557610 ||  || — || November 17, 2014 || Haleakala || Pan-STARRS ||  || align=right | 1.3 km || 
|-id=611 bgcolor=#d6d6d6
| 557611 ||  || — || September 17, 2009 || Catalina || CSS ||  || align=right | 1.8 km || 
|-id=612 bgcolor=#E9E9E9
| 557612 ||  || — || March 16, 2012 || Mount Lemmon || Mount Lemmon Survey ||  || align=right | 2.2 km || 
|-id=613 bgcolor=#d6d6d6
| 557613 ||  || — || October 15, 2009 || Mount Lemmon || Mount Lemmon Survey ||  || align=right | 1.6 km || 
|-id=614 bgcolor=#E9E9E9
| 557614 ||  || — || November 10, 2010 || Mount Lemmon || Mount Lemmon Survey ||  || align=right | 1.0 km || 
|-id=615 bgcolor=#E9E9E9
| 557615 ||  || — || May 23, 2001 || Cerro Tololo || J. L. Elliot, L. H. Wasserman ||  || align=right | 1.0 km || 
|-id=616 bgcolor=#E9E9E9
| 557616 ||  || — || October 2, 2014 || Mount Lemmon || Mount Lemmon Survey ||  || align=right | 1.7 km || 
|-id=617 bgcolor=#E9E9E9
| 557617 ||  || — || October 25, 2014 || Haleakala || Pan-STARRS ||  || align=right | 1.9 km || 
|-id=618 bgcolor=#E9E9E9
| 557618 ||  || — || September 30, 2005 || Mount Lemmon || Mount Lemmon Survey ||  || align=right | 2.4 km || 
|-id=619 bgcolor=#E9E9E9
| 557619 ||  || — || August 6, 2005 || Palomar || NEAT ||  || align=right | 1.5 km || 
|-id=620 bgcolor=#d6d6d6
| 557620 ||  || — || October 21, 2009 || Tzec Maun || S. Shurpakov ||  || align=right | 2.5 km || 
|-id=621 bgcolor=#E9E9E9
| 557621 ||  || — || October 25, 2005 || Mount Lemmon || Mount Lemmon Survey ||  || align=right | 1.7 km || 
|-id=622 bgcolor=#E9E9E9
| 557622 ||  || — || September 30, 2005 || Mount Lemmon || Mount Lemmon Survey ||  || align=right | 1.6 km || 
|-id=623 bgcolor=#E9E9E9
| 557623 ||  || — || December 2, 2010 || Kitt Peak || Spacewatch ||  || align=right | 1.4 km || 
|-id=624 bgcolor=#E9E9E9
| 557624 ||  || — || November 16, 2014 || Mount Lemmon || Mount Lemmon Survey ||  || align=right | 1.5 km || 
|-id=625 bgcolor=#d6d6d6
| 557625 ||  || — || November 16, 2014 || Kitt Peak || Spacewatch ||  || align=right | 2.4 km || 
|-id=626 bgcolor=#E9E9E9
| 557626 ||  || — || October 25, 2005 || Mount Lemmon || Mount Lemmon Survey ||  || align=right | 1.7 km || 
|-id=627 bgcolor=#E9E9E9
| 557627 ||  || — || November 17, 2014 || Mount Lemmon || Mount Lemmon Survey ||  || align=right | 1.2 km || 
|-id=628 bgcolor=#d6d6d6
| 557628 ||  || — || October 22, 2014 || Mount Lemmon || Mount Lemmon Survey ||  || align=right | 1.8 km || 
|-id=629 bgcolor=#E9E9E9
| 557629 ||  || — || January 24, 2007 || Kitt Peak || Spacewatch ||  || align=right | 1.2 km || 
|-id=630 bgcolor=#E9E9E9
| 557630 ||  || — || September 29, 2005 || Mount Lemmon || Mount Lemmon Survey ||  || align=right | 1.3 km || 
|-id=631 bgcolor=#E9E9E9
| 557631 ||  || — || September 13, 2005 || Kitt Peak || Spacewatch ||  || align=right | 1.1 km || 
|-id=632 bgcolor=#E9E9E9
| 557632 ||  || — || February 23, 2007 || Kitt Peak || Spacewatch ||  || align=right | 2.0 km || 
|-id=633 bgcolor=#E9E9E9
| 557633 ||  || — || August 27, 2009 || Kitt Peak || Spacewatch ||  || align=right | 1.7 km || 
|-id=634 bgcolor=#E9E9E9
| 557634 ||  || — || November 17, 2014 || Mount Lemmon || Mount Lemmon Survey ||  || align=right | 1.2 km || 
|-id=635 bgcolor=#E9E9E9
| 557635 ||  || — || February 23, 2007 || Mount Lemmon || Mount Lemmon Survey ||  || align=right | 1.7 km || 
|-id=636 bgcolor=#E9E9E9
| 557636 ||  || — || September 24, 2014 || Mount Lemmon || Mount Lemmon Survey ||  || align=right | 2.1 km || 
|-id=637 bgcolor=#E9E9E9
| 557637 ||  || — || November 6, 2010 || Mount Lemmon || Mount Lemmon Survey ||  || align=right | 1.1 km || 
|-id=638 bgcolor=#E9E9E9
| 557638 ||  || — || March 28, 2012 || Mount Lemmon || Mount Lemmon Survey ||  || align=right | 2.0 km || 
|-id=639 bgcolor=#E9E9E9
| 557639 ||  || — || September 12, 2009 || Kitt Peak || Spacewatch ||  || align=right | 1.9 km || 
|-id=640 bgcolor=#E9E9E9
| 557640 ||  || — || March 29, 2008 || Kitt Peak || Spacewatch ||  || align=right | 1.3 km || 
|-id=641 bgcolor=#d6d6d6
| 557641 ||  || — || January 10, 2006 || Kitt Peak || Spacewatch ||  || align=right | 2.1 km || 
|-id=642 bgcolor=#E9E9E9
| 557642 ||  || — || November 17, 2014 || Mount Lemmon || Mount Lemmon Survey ||  || align=right | 1.4 km || 
|-id=643 bgcolor=#E9E9E9
| 557643 ||  || — || October 5, 2005 || Kitt Peak || Spacewatch ||  || align=right | 1.1 km || 
|-id=644 bgcolor=#E9E9E9
| 557644 ||  || — || November 4, 2005 || Mount Lemmon || Mount Lemmon Survey ||  || align=right | 1.8 km || 
|-id=645 bgcolor=#E9E9E9
| 557645 ||  || — || September 15, 2009 || Kitt Peak || Spacewatch ||  || align=right | 1.7 km || 
|-id=646 bgcolor=#d6d6d6
| 557646 ||  || — || September 20, 2014 || Haleakala || Pan-STARRS ||  || align=right | 2.0 km || 
|-id=647 bgcolor=#E9E9E9
| 557647 ||  || — || October 25, 2014 || Haleakala || Pan-STARRS ||  || align=right | 1.8 km || 
|-id=648 bgcolor=#d6d6d6
| 557648 ||  || — || November 17, 2014 || Mount Lemmon || Mount Lemmon Survey ||  || align=right | 2.0 km || 
|-id=649 bgcolor=#E9E9E9
| 557649 ||  || — || March 5, 2008 || Mount Lemmon || Mount Lemmon Survey ||  || align=right | 1.4 km || 
|-id=650 bgcolor=#E9E9E9
| 557650 ||  || — || March 23, 2012 || Mount Lemmon || Mount Lemmon Survey ||  || align=right | 1.1 km || 
|-id=651 bgcolor=#E9E9E9
| 557651 ||  || — || December 2, 2010 || Mount Lemmon || Mount Lemmon Survey ||  || align=right | 1.1 km || 
|-id=652 bgcolor=#E9E9E9
| 557652 ||  || — || February 13, 2011 || Mount Lemmon || Mount Lemmon Survey ||  || align=right | 1.7 km || 
|-id=653 bgcolor=#E9E9E9
| 557653 ||  || — || January 17, 2011 || Mount Lemmon || Mount Lemmon Survey ||  || align=right | 1.7 km || 
|-id=654 bgcolor=#d6d6d6
| 557654 ||  || — || July 14, 2013 || Haleakala || Pan-STARRS ||  || align=right | 1.9 km || 
|-id=655 bgcolor=#E9E9E9
| 557655 ||  || — || May 4, 2008 || Kitt Peak || Spacewatch ||  || align=right | 1.4 km || 
|-id=656 bgcolor=#d6d6d6
| 557656 ||  || — || September 20, 2014 || Haleakala || Pan-STARRS ||  || align=right | 1.8 km || 
|-id=657 bgcolor=#E9E9E9
| 557657 ||  || — || November 14, 2010 || Mount Lemmon || Mount Lemmon Survey ||  || align=right | 1.3 km || 
|-id=658 bgcolor=#E9E9E9
| 557658 ||  || — || December 8, 2010 || Kitt Peak || Spacewatch ||  || align=right | 2.1 km || 
|-id=659 bgcolor=#d6d6d6
| 557659 ||  || — || October 3, 2008 || Kitt Peak || Spacewatch ||  || align=right | 1.9 km || 
|-id=660 bgcolor=#E9E9E9
| 557660 ||  || — || September 12, 2005 || Kitt Peak || Spacewatch ||  || align=right | 1.2 km || 
|-id=661 bgcolor=#E9E9E9
| 557661 ||  || — || November 22, 2005 || Kitt Peak || Spacewatch ||  || align=right | 2.0 km || 
|-id=662 bgcolor=#E9E9E9
| 557662 ||  || — || February 27, 2012 || Haleakala || Pan-STARRS ||  || align=right | 1.2 km || 
|-id=663 bgcolor=#E9E9E9
| 557663 ||  || — || September 2, 2014 || Haleakala || Pan-STARRS ||  || align=right | 2.3 km || 
|-id=664 bgcolor=#E9E9E9
| 557664 ||  || — || October 14, 2014 || Kitt Peak || Spacewatch ||  || align=right data-sort-value="0.75" | 750 m || 
|-id=665 bgcolor=#E9E9E9
| 557665 ||  || — || October 25, 2014 || Oukaimeden || C. Rinner ||  || align=right data-sort-value="0.99" | 990 m || 
|-id=666 bgcolor=#E9E9E9
| 557666 ||  || — || September 19, 2009 || Mount Lemmon || Mount Lemmon Survey ||  || align=right | 1.6 km || 
|-id=667 bgcolor=#E9E9E9
| 557667 ||  || — || April 22, 2012 || Mount Lemmon || Mount Lemmon Survey ||  || align=right | 1.8 km || 
|-id=668 bgcolor=#E9E9E9
| 557668 ||  || — || June 5, 2013 || Mount Lemmon || Mount Lemmon Survey ||  || align=right data-sort-value="0.82" | 820 m || 
|-id=669 bgcolor=#E9E9E9
| 557669 ||  || — || April 27, 2012 || Haleakala || Pan-STARRS ||  || align=right | 1.1 km || 
|-id=670 bgcolor=#E9E9E9
| 557670 ||  || — || October 25, 2014 || Haleakala || Pan-STARRS ||  || align=right | 1.7 km || 
|-id=671 bgcolor=#E9E9E9
| 557671 ||  || — || May 14, 2008 || Mount Lemmon || Mount Lemmon Survey ||  || align=right | 1.5 km || 
|-id=672 bgcolor=#fefefe
| 557672 ||  || — || February 8, 2013 || Haleakala || Pan-STARRS ||  || align=right | 1.2 km || 
|-id=673 bgcolor=#E9E9E9
| 557673 ||  || — || November 19, 2014 || Mount Lemmon || Mount Lemmon Survey ||  || align=right | 1.7 km || 
|-id=674 bgcolor=#E9E9E9
| 557674 ||  || — || June 3, 2014 || Haleakala || Pan-STARRS ||  || align=right | 1.7 km || 
|-id=675 bgcolor=#E9E9E9
| 557675 ||  || — || August 29, 2014 || Haleakala || Pan-STARRS ||  || align=right data-sort-value="0.96" | 960 m || 
|-id=676 bgcolor=#E9E9E9
| 557676 ||  || — || October 4, 2014 || Mount Lemmon || Mount Lemmon Survey ||  || align=right | 1.3 km || 
|-id=677 bgcolor=#d6d6d6
| 557677 ||  || — || January 14, 2011 || Mount Lemmon || Mount Lemmon Survey ||  || align=right | 1.8 km || 
|-id=678 bgcolor=#E9E9E9
| 557678 ||  || — || March 12, 2007 || Mount Lemmon || Mount Lemmon Survey || HOF || align=right | 2.2 km || 
|-id=679 bgcolor=#C2FFFF
| 557679 ||  || — || May 17, 2009 || Mount Lemmon || Mount Lemmon Survey || L5 || align=right | 15 km || 
|-id=680 bgcolor=#fefefe
| 557680 ||  || — || November 19, 2009 || Kitt Peak || Spacewatch || H || align=right data-sort-value="0.50" | 500 m || 
|-id=681 bgcolor=#C2FFFF
| 557681 ||  || — || June 27, 2011 || Kitt Peak || Spacewatch || L5 || align=right | 11 km || 
|-id=682 bgcolor=#E9E9E9
| 557682 ||  || — || September 25, 2009 || Kitt Peak || Spacewatch ||  || align=right | 1.6 km || 
|-id=683 bgcolor=#d6d6d6
| 557683 ||  || — || November 17, 2014 || Kitt Peak || Spacewatch ||  || align=right | 2.7 km || 
|-id=684 bgcolor=#E9E9E9
| 557684 ||  || — || November 17, 2014 || Kitt Peak || Spacewatch ||  || align=right | 1.8 km || 
|-id=685 bgcolor=#E9E9E9
| 557685 ||  || — || December 8, 2005 || Kitt Peak || Spacewatch ||  || align=right | 1.7 km || 
|-id=686 bgcolor=#E9E9E9
| 557686 ||  || — || April 16, 2007 || Mount Lemmon || Mount Lemmon Survey ||  || align=right | 1.9 km || 
|-id=687 bgcolor=#E9E9E9
| 557687 ||  || — || September 3, 2000 || Apache Point || SDSS Collaboration ||  || align=right | 1.4 km || 
|-id=688 bgcolor=#E9E9E9
| 557688 ||  || — || August 12, 2013 || Haleakala || Pan-STARRS ||  || align=right | 1.6 km || 
|-id=689 bgcolor=#E9E9E9
| 557689 ||  || — || August 17, 2009 || Kitt Peak || Spacewatch ||  || align=right | 1.2 km || 
|-id=690 bgcolor=#E9E9E9
| 557690 ||  || — || November 2, 2010 || Kitt Peak || Spacewatch ||  || align=right | 1.2 km || 
|-id=691 bgcolor=#E9E9E9
| 557691 ||  || — || October 28, 2014 || Haleakala || Pan-STARRS ||  || align=right data-sort-value="0.99" | 990 m || 
|-id=692 bgcolor=#E9E9E9
| 557692 ||  || — || August 31, 2014 || Haleakala || Pan-STARRS ||  || align=right | 1.2 km || 
|-id=693 bgcolor=#E9E9E9
| 557693 ||  || — || September 13, 2005 || Kitt Peak || Spacewatch ||  || align=right | 1.3 km || 
|-id=694 bgcolor=#d6d6d6
| 557694 ||  || — || November 24, 2009 || Kitt Peak || Spacewatch ||  || align=right | 2.1 km || 
|-id=695 bgcolor=#E9E9E9
| 557695 ||  || — || October 10, 1996 || Kitt Peak || Spacewatch ||  || align=right | 1.5 km || 
|-id=696 bgcolor=#d6d6d6
| 557696 ||  || — || October 22, 2009 || Mount Lemmon || Mount Lemmon Survey ||  || align=right | 2.1 km || 
|-id=697 bgcolor=#E9E9E9
| 557697 ||  || — || January 23, 2011 || Mount Lemmon || Mount Lemmon Survey ||  || align=right | 1.4 km || 
|-id=698 bgcolor=#E9E9E9
| 557698 ||  || — || October 12, 2005 || Kitt Peak || Spacewatch ||  || align=right | 2.0 km || 
|-id=699 bgcolor=#E9E9E9
| 557699 ||  || — || November 17, 2014 || Haleakala || Pan-STARRS ||  || align=right | 1.5 km || 
|-id=700 bgcolor=#E9E9E9
| 557700 ||  || — || September 27, 2005 || Kitt Peak || Spacewatch ||  || align=right | 1.0 km || 
|}

557701–557800 

|-bgcolor=#E9E9E9
| 557701 ||  || — || October 22, 2014 || Kitt Peak || Spacewatch ||  || align=right | 1.7 km || 
|-id=702 bgcolor=#E9E9E9
| 557702 ||  || — || October 24, 2014 || Kitt Peak || Spacewatch ||  || align=right | 1.6 km || 
|-id=703 bgcolor=#E9E9E9
| 557703 ||  || — || May 1, 2012 || Mount Lemmon || Mount Lemmon Survey ||  || align=right | 2.0 km || 
|-id=704 bgcolor=#E9E9E9
| 557704 ||  || — || December 8, 2010 || Kitt Peak || Spacewatch ||  || align=right | 1.1 km || 
|-id=705 bgcolor=#E9E9E9
| 557705 ||  || — || January 28, 2011 || Mount Lemmon || Mount Lemmon Survey ||  || align=right | 1.8 km || 
|-id=706 bgcolor=#d6d6d6
| 557706 ||  || — || April 20, 2012 || Mount Lemmon || Mount Lemmon Survey ||  || align=right | 1.9 km || 
|-id=707 bgcolor=#E9E9E9
| 557707 ||  || — || March 27, 2012 || Mayhill-ISON || L. Elenin ||  || align=right | 1.5 km || 
|-id=708 bgcolor=#E9E9E9
| 557708 ||  || — || October 1, 2005 || Mount Lemmon || Mount Lemmon Survey ||  || align=right | 1.7 km || 
|-id=709 bgcolor=#E9E9E9
| 557709 ||  || — || October 26, 2014 || Mount Lemmon || Mount Lemmon Survey ||  || align=right | 1.7 km || 
|-id=710 bgcolor=#d6d6d6
| 557710 ||  || — || November 26, 2009 || Mount Lemmon || Mount Lemmon Survey ||  || align=right | 2.3 km || 
|-id=711 bgcolor=#E9E9E9
| 557711 ||  || — || February 29, 2012 || Kitt Peak || Spacewatch ||  || align=right | 2.1 km || 
|-id=712 bgcolor=#E9E9E9
| 557712 ||  || — || January 27, 2007 || Mount Lemmon || Mount Lemmon Survey ||  || align=right | 1.2 km || 
|-id=713 bgcolor=#E9E9E9
| 557713 ||  || — || October 24, 2014 || Kitt Peak || Spacewatch ||  || align=right | 1.1 km || 
|-id=714 bgcolor=#E9E9E9
| 557714 ||  || — || August 31, 2014 || Haleakala || Pan-STARRS ||  || align=right data-sort-value="0.70" | 700 m || 
|-id=715 bgcolor=#d6d6d6
| 557715 ||  || — || August 20, 2014 || Haleakala || Pan-STARRS ||  || align=right | 2.3 km || 
|-id=716 bgcolor=#fefefe
| 557716 ||  || — || September 19, 2014 || Haleakala || Pan-STARRS || H || align=right data-sort-value="0.54" | 540 m || 
|-id=717 bgcolor=#fefefe
| 557717 ||  || — || November 20, 2014 || Haleakala || Pan-STARRS ||  || align=right data-sort-value="0.95" | 950 m || 
|-id=718 bgcolor=#E9E9E9
| 557718 ||  || — || September 19, 2014 || Haleakala || Pan-STARRS ||  || align=right | 1.2 km || 
|-id=719 bgcolor=#E9E9E9
| 557719 ||  || — || November 1, 2010 || Kitt Peak || Spacewatch ||  || align=right | 1.3 km || 
|-id=720 bgcolor=#E9E9E9
| 557720 ||  || — || October 9, 2001 || Kitt Peak || Spacewatch ||  || align=right | 1.5 km || 
|-id=721 bgcolor=#d6d6d6
| 557721 ||  || — || September 19, 2014 || Haleakala || Pan-STARRS ||  || align=right | 2.0 km || 
|-id=722 bgcolor=#E9E9E9
| 557722 ||  || — || February 28, 2008 || Mount Lemmon || Mount Lemmon Survey ||  || align=right | 1.4 km || 
|-id=723 bgcolor=#E9E9E9
| 557723 ||  || — || June 7, 2013 || Haleakala || Pan-STARRS ||  || align=right | 1.4 km || 
|-id=724 bgcolor=#E9E9E9
| 557724 ||  || — || September 18, 2014 || Haleakala || Pan-STARRS ||  || align=right | 1.4 km || 
|-id=725 bgcolor=#E9E9E9
| 557725 ||  || — || October 2, 2014 || Haleakala || Pan-STARRS ||  || align=right | 1.1 km || 
|-id=726 bgcolor=#E9E9E9
| 557726 ||  || — || October 1, 2005 || Mount Lemmon || Mount Lemmon Survey ||  || align=right | 1.4 km || 
|-id=727 bgcolor=#E9E9E9
| 557727 ||  || — || June 18, 2013 || Haleakala || Pan-STARRS ||  || align=right | 1.2 km || 
|-id=728 bgcolor=#d6d6d6
| 557728 ||  || — || March 15, 2002 || Palomar || NEAT ||  || align=right | 2.4 km || 
|-id=729 bgcolor=#E9E9E9
| 557729 ||  || — || March 24, 2012 || Mount Lemmon || Mount Lemmon Survey ||  || align=right | 1.7 km || 
|-id=730 bgcolor=#E9E9E9
| 557730 ||  || — || September 2, 2014 || Haleakala || Pan-STARRS ||  || align=right data-sort-value="0.89" | 890 m || 
|-id=731 bgcolor=#E9E9E9
| 557731 ||  || — || September 2, 2014 || Haleakala || Pan-STARRS ||  || align=right data-sort-value="0.99" | 990 m || 
|-id=732 bgcolor=#E9E9E9
| 557732 ||  || — || September 30, 2014 || Kitt Peak || Spacewatch ||  || align=right | 1.6 km || 
|-id=733 bgcolor=#E9E9E9
| 557733 ||  || — || March 16, 2012 || Mount Lemmon || Mount Lemmon Survey ||  || align=right | 1.4 km || 
|-id=734 bgcolor=#E9E9E9
| 557734 ||  || — || October 28, 2014 || Haleakala || Pan-STARRS ||  || align=right | 1.3 km || 
|-id=735 bgcolor=#d6d6d6
| 557735 ||  || — || December 28, 2003 || Socorro || LINEAR ||  || align=right | 3.3 km || 
|-id=736 bgcolor=#d6d6d6
| 557736 ||  || — || October 3, 2008 || Junk Bond || D. Healy ||  || align=right | 3.1 km || 
|-id=737 bgcolor=#E9E9E9
| 557737 ||  || — || January 14, 2002 || Palomar || NEAT ||  || align=right | 2.3 km || 
|-id=738 bgcolor=#E9E9E9
| 557738 ||  || — || July 4, 2013 || Haleakala || Pan-STARRS ||  || align=right | 1.2 km || 
|-id=739 bgcolor=#E9E9E9
| 557739 ||  || — || February 25, 2007 || Kitt Peak || Spacewatch ||  || align=right | 1.4 km || 
|-id=740 bgcolor=#E9E9E9
| 557740 ||  || — || September 20, 2014 || Haleakala || Pan-STARRS ||  || align=right | 1.5 km || 
|-id=741 bgcolor=#E9E9E9
| 557741 ||  || — || September 20, 2014 || Haleakala || Pan-STARRS ||  || align=right | 1.6 km || 
|-id=742 bgcolor=#E9E9E9
| 557742 ||  || — || May 3, 2013 || Mount Lemmon || Mount Lemmon Survey ||  || align=right | 1.3 km || 
|-id=743 bgcolor=#E9E9E9
| 557743 ||  || — || June 17, 2013 || Haleakala || Pan-STARRS ||  || align=right | 1.7 km || 
|-id=744 bgcolor=#E9E9E9
| 557744 ||  || — || November 21, 2014 || Mount Lemmon || Mount Lemmon Survey ||  || align=right | 1.7 km || 
|-id=745 bgcolor=#E9E9E9
| 557745 ||  || — || November 21, 2014 || Mount Lemmon || Mount Lemmon Survey ||  || align=right | 1.1 km || 
|-id=746 bgcolor=#E9E9E9
| 557746 ||  || — || November 13, 2010 || Mount Lemmon || Mount Lemmon Survey ||  || align=right data-sort-value="0.88" | 880 m || 
|-id=747 bgcolor=#FA8072
| 557747 ||  || — || June 2, 2011 || Haleakala || Pan-STARRS || H || align=right data-sort-value="0.55" | 550 m || 
|-id=748 bgcolor=#fefefe
| 557748 ||  || — || October 20, 2014 || Kitt Peak || Spacewatch || H || align=right data-sort-value="0.45" | 450 m || 
|-id=749 bgcolor=#E9E9E9
| 557749 ||  || — || July 16, 2004 || Cerro Tololo || Cerro Tololo Obs. ||  || align=right | 1.5 km || 
|-id=750 bgcolor=#d6d6d6
| 557750 ||  || — || October 24, 2003 || Kitt Peak || Spacewatch ||  || align=right | 2.3 km || 
|-id=751 bgcolor=#E9E9E9
| 557751 ||  || — || May 15, 2005 || Mount Lemmon || Mount Lemmon Survey ||  || align=right | 1.5 km || 
|-id=752 bgcolor=#E9E9E9
| 557752 ||  || — || March 29, 2012 || Mount Lemmon || Mount Lemmon Survey ||  || align=right | 2.2 km || 
|-id=753 bgcolor=#d6d6d6
| 557753 ||  || — || October 27, 2009 || Kitt Peak || Spacewatch ||  || align=right | 1.9 km || 
|-id=754 bgcolor=#E9E9E9
| 557754 ||  || — || September 26, 2009 || Kitt Peak || Spacewatch ||  || align=right | 1.7 km || 
|-id=755 bgcolor=#E9E9E9
| 557755 ||  || — || January 23, 2011 || Mount Lemmon || Mount Lemmon Survey || AGN || align=right data-sort-value="0.84" | 840 m || 
|-id=756 bgcolor=#E9E9E9
| 557756 ||  || — || November 17, 2014 || Haleakala || Pan-STARRS ||  || align=right | 1.7 km || 
|-id=757 bgcolor=#C2FFFF
| 557757 ||  || — || November 17, 2014 || Haleakala || Pan-STARRS || L5 || align=right | 9.7 km || 
|-id=758 bgcolor=#fefefe
| 557758 ||  || — || May 16, 2013 || Mount Lemmon || Mount Lemmon Survey || H || align=right data-sort-value="0.56" | 560 m || 
|-id=759 bgcolor=#E9E9E9
| 557759 ||  || — || September 14, 2001 || Palomar || NEAT ||  || align=right | 1.3 km || 
|-id=760 bgcolor=#E9E9E9
| 557760 ||  || — || September 15, 2009 || Kitt Peak || Spacewatch ||  || align=right | 1.6 km || 
|-id=761 bgcolor=#C2FFFF
| 557761 ||  || — || April 4, 2008 || Mount Lemmon || Mount Lemmon Survey || L5 || align=right | 8.7 km || 
|-id=762 bgcolor=#E9E9E9
| 557762 ||  || — || April 1, 2012 || Mount Lemmon || Mount Lemmon Survey ||  || align=right | 2.1 km || 
|-id=763 bgcolor=#E9E9E9
| 557763 ||  || — || October 25, 2014 || Mount Lemmon || Mount Lemmon Survey ||  || align=right | 1.6 km || 
|-id=764 bgcolor=#E9E9E9
| 557764 ||  || — || September 20, 2009 || Kitt Peak || Spacewatch ||  || align=right | 2.1 km || 
|-id=765 bgcolor=#E9E9E9
| 557765 ||  || — || September 18, 1995 || Kitt Peak || Spacewatch ||  || align=right | 1.9 km || 
|-id=766 bgcolor=#E9E9E9
| 557766 ||  || — || November 26, 2005 || Mount Lemmon || Mount Lemmon Survey ||  || align=right | 1.8 km || 
|-id=767 bgcolor=#E9E9E9
| 557767 ||  || — || November 17, 2014 || Mount Lemmon || Mount Lemmon Survey ||  || align=right | 1.8 km || 
|-id=768 bgcolor=#E9E9E9
| 557768 ||  || — || October 28, 2005 || Mount Lemmon || Mount Lemmon Survey ||  || align=right | 2.3 km || 
|-id=769 bgcolor=#E9E9E9
| 557769 ||  || — || October 26, 2005 || Kitt Peak || Spacewatch || MRX || align=right data-sort-value="0.79" | 790 m || 
|-id=770 bgcolor=#E9E9E9
| 557770 ||  || — || August 20, 2009 || Kitt Peak || Spacewatch ||  || align=right | 1.7 km || 
|-id=771 bgcolor=#d6d6d6
| 557771 ||  || — || May 12, 2012 || Mount Lemmon || Mount Lemmon Survey ||  || align=right | 1.6 km || 
|-id=772 bgcolor=#E9E9E9
| 557772 ||  || — || July 13, 2013 || Haleakala || Pan-STARRS ||  || align=right | 1.6 km || 
|-id=773 bgcolor=#d6d6d6
| 557773 ||  || — || March 27, 2011 || Mount Lemmon || Mount Lemmon Survey ||  || align=right | 2.4 km || 
|-id=774 bgcolor=#E9E9E9
| 557774 ||  || — || July 12, 2013 || Haleakala || Pan-STARRS ||  || align=right | 1.7 km || 
|-id=775 bgcolor=#E9E9E9
| 557775 ||  || — || November 6, 2005 || Mount Lemmon || Mount Lemmon Survey ||  || align=right | 1.9 km || 
|-id=776 bgcolor=#d6d6d6
| 557776 ||  || — || November 18, 2014 || Haleakala || Pan-STARRS ||  || align=right | 2.0 km || 
|-id=777 bgcolor=#E9E9E9
| 557777 ||  || — || June 17, 2005 || Mount Lemmon || Mount Lemmon Survey ||  || align=right data-sort-value="0.89" | 890 m || 
|-id=778 bgcolor=#d6d6d6
| 557778 ||  || — || October 25, 2014 || Haleakala || Pan-STARRS ||  || align=right | 2.7 km || 
|-id=779 bgcolor=#E9E9E9
| 557779 ||  || — || September 25, 1995 || Kitt Peak || Spacewatch ||  || align=right | 1.7 km || 
|-id=780 bgcolor=#E9E9E9
| 557780 ||  || — || February 1, 2012 || Kitt Peak || Spacewatch ||  || align=right | 2.3 km || 
|-id=781 bgcolor=#E9E9E9
| 557781 ||  || — || September 20, 2014 || Haleakala || Pan-STARRS ||  || align=right | 1.5 km || 
|-id=782 bgcolor=#d6d6d6
| 557782 ||  || — || April 23, 2011 || Haleakala || Pan-STARRS ||  || align=right | 1.8 km || 
|-id=783 bgcolor=#E9E9E9
| 557783 ||  || — || March 23, 2003 || Apache Point || SDSS Collaboration ||  || align=right | 2.4 km || 
|-id=784 bgcolor=#E9E9E9
| 557784 ||  || — || October 14, 2001 || Apache Point || SDSS Collaboration ||  || align=right | 1.8 km || 
|-id=785 bgcolor=#E9E9E9
| 557785 ||  || — || July 3, 2005 || Palomar || NEAT ||  || align=right | 1.5 km || 
|-id=786 bgcolor=#E9E9E9
| 557786 ||  || — || November 8, 2010 || Mount Lemmon || Mount Lemmon Survey ||  || align=right | 1.6 km || 
|-id=787 bgcolor=#d6d6d6
| 557787 ||  || — || November 21, 2014 || Mount Lemmon || Mount Lemmon Survey ||  || align=right | 2.2 km || 
|-id=788 bgcolor=#E9E9E9
| 557788 ||  || — || October 28, 2014 || Haleakala || Pan-STARRS ||  || align=right | 1.9 km || 
|-id=789 bgcolor=#E9E9E9
| 557789 ||  || — || December 26, 2006 || Kitt Peak || Spacewatch ||  || align=right | 2.2 km || 
|-id=790 bgcolor=#E9E9E9
| 557790 ||  || — || October 17, 2010 || Mount Lemmon || Mount Lemmon Survey ||  || align=right | 1.5 km || 
|-id=791 bgcolor=#E9E9E9
| 557791 ||  || — || May 31, 2009 || Cerro Burek || Alianza S4 Obs. ||  || align=right | 2.0 km || 
|-id=792 bgcolor=#E9E9E9
| 557792 ||  || — || January 17, 2007 || Kitt Peak || Spacewatch ||  || align=right | 1.8 km || 
|-id=793 bgcolor=#E9E9E9
| 557793 ||  || — || March 29, 2008 || Kitt Peak || Spacewatch ||  || align=right | 1.4 km || 
|-id=794 bgcolor=#E9E9E9
| 557794 ||  || — || September 17, 2009 || Catalina || CSS ||  || align=right | 2.5 km || 
|-id=795 bgcolor=#E9E9E9
| 557795 ||  || — || October 3, 2014 || Mount Lemmon || Mount Lemmon Survey ||  || align=right data-sort-value="0.91" | 910 m || 
|-id=796 bgcolor=#E9E9E9
| 557796 ||  || — || July 18, 2013 || Haleakala || Pan-STARRS ||  || align=right | 1.9 km || 
|-id=797 bgcolor=#E9E9E9
| 557797 ||  || — || October 24, 2005 || Palomar || NEAT ||  || align=right | 1.8 km || 
|-id=798 bgcolor=#E9E9E9
| 557798 ||  || — || August 28, 2005 || Kitt Peak || Spacewatch ||  || align=right | 1.1 km || 
|-id=799 bgcolor=#E9E9E9
| 557799 ||  || — || July 1, 2013 || Haleakala || Pan-STARRS ||  || align=right | 1.5 km || 
|-id=800 bgcolor=#d6d6d6
| 557800 ||  || — || January 23, 2006 || Kitt Peak || Spacewatch ||  || align=right | 2.4 km || 
|}

557801–557900 

|-bgcolor=#E9E9E9
| 557801 ||  || — || April 27, 2012 || Haleakala || Pan-STARRS ||  || align=right | 1.6 km || 
|-id=802 bgcolor=#E9E9E9
| 557802 ||  || — || January 2, 2011 || Mount Lemmon || Mount Lemmon Survey ||  || align=right | 1.7 km || 
|-id=803 bgcolor=#E9E9E9
| 557803 ||  || — || March 25, 2000 || Kitt Peak || Spacewatch ||  || align=right | 1.4 km || 
|-id=804 bgcolor=#d6d6d6
| 557804 ||  || — || January 6, 2010 || Catalina || CSS ||  || align=right | 2.8 km || 
|-id=805 bgcolor=#E9E9E9
| 557805 ||  || — || March 27, 2012 || Mount Lemmon || Mount Lemmon Survey ||  || align=right | 1.5 km || 
|-id=806 bgcolor=#E9E9E9
| 557806 ||  || — || September 20, 2014 || Haleakala || Pan-STARRS ||  || align=right | 1.3 km || 
|-id=807 bgcolor=#E9E9E9
| 557807 ||  || — || January 2, 2011 || Mount Lemmon || Mount Lemmon Survey ||  || align=right | 2.0 km || 
|-id=808 bgcolor=#E9E9E9
| 557808 ||  || — || November 21, 2014 || Haleakala || Pan-STARRS ||  || align=right data-sort-value="0.79" | 790 m || 
|-id=809 bgcolor=#E9E9E9
| 557809 ||  || — || November 21, 2014 || Haleakala || Pan-STARRS ||  || align=right | 1.1 km || 
|-id=810 bgcolor=#E9E9E9
| 557810 ||  || — || March 26, 2012 || Mount Lemmon || Mount Lemmon Survey ||  || align=right | 2.0 km || 
|-id=811 bgcolor=#d6d6d6
| 557811 ||  || — || September 30, 2003 || Kitt Peak || Spacewatch ||  || align=right | 2.4 km || 
|-id=812 bgcolor=#E9E9E9
| 557812 ||  || — || September 29, 2009 || Kitt Peak || Spacewatch ||  || align=right | 1.4 km || 
|-id=813 bgcolor=#d6d6d6
| 557813 ||  || — || November 21, 2014 || Mount Lemmon || Pan-STARRS || TEL || align=right | 1.3 km || 
|-id=814 bgcolor=#E9E9E9
| 557814 ||  || — || September 22, 2014 || Haleakala || Pan-STARRS ||  || align=right data-sort-value="0.77" | 770 m || 
|-id=815 bgcolor=#E9E9E9
| 557815 ||  || — || November 21, 2014 || Haleakala || Pan-STARRS ||  || align=right | 1.1 km || 
|-id=816 bgcolor=#fefefe
| 557816 ||  || — || November 21, 2014 || Haleakala || Pan-STARRS ||  || align=right data-sort-value="0.60" | 600 m || 
|-id=817 bgcolor=#E9E9E9
| 557817 ||  || — || November 21, 2014 || Haleakala || Pan-STARRS ||  || align=right | 1.8 km || 
|-id=818 bgcolor=#E9E9E9
| 557818 ||  || — || September 28, 2009 || Mount Lemmon || Mount Lemmon Survey ||  || align=right | 1.9 km || 
|-id=819 bgcolor=#d6d6d6
| 557819 ||  || — || March 5, 2006 || Kitt Peak || Spacewatch ||  || align=right | 2.3 km || 
|-id=820 bgcolor=#d6d6d6
| 557820 ||  || — || February 7, 2006 || Kitt Peak || Spacewatch ||  || align=right | 1.7 km || 
|-id=821 bgcolor=#d6d6d6
| 557821 ||  || — || March 27, 2011 || Mount Lemmon || Mount Lemmon Survey ||  || align=right | 2.8 km || 
|-id=822 bgcolor=#E9E9E9
| 557822 ||  || — || September 18, 2014 || Haleakala || Pan-STARRS ||  || align=right | 1.1 km || 
|-id=823 bgcolor=#E9E9E9
| 557823 ||  || — || November 21, 2014 || Haleakala || Pan-STARRS ||  || align=right data-sort-value="0.98" | 980 m || 
|-id=824 bgcolor=#E9E9E9
| 557824 ||  || — || November 21, 2014 || Haleakala || Pan-STARRS ||  || align=right | 1.8 km || 
|-id=825 bgcolor=#E9E9E9
| 557825 ||  || — || November 21, 2014 || Kitt Peak || Pan-STARRS ||  || align=right | 1.4 km || 
|-id=826 bgcolor=#d6d6d6
| 557826 ||  || — || February 25, 2006 || Kitt Peak || Spacewatch ||  || align=right | 2.1 km || 
|-id=827 bgcolor=#E9E9E9
| 557827 ||  || — || January 30, 2011 || Mount Lemmon || Mount Lemmon Survey ||  || align=right | 1.9 km || 
|-id=828 bgcolor=#E9E9E9
| 557828 ||  || — || March 13, 2012 || Mount Lemmon || Mount Lemmon Survey ||  || align=right | 2.1 km || 
|-id=829 bgcolor=#E9E9E9
| 557829 ||  || — || April 11, 2013 || Kitt Peak || Spacewatch ||  || align=right | 1.2 km || 
|-id=830 bgcolor=#E9E9E9
| 557830 ||  || — || December 8, 2010 || Mount Lemmon || Mount Lemmon Survey ||  || align=right | 1.4 km || 
|-id=831 bgcolor=#d6d6d6
| 557831 ||  || — || March 13, 2011 || Mount Lemmon || Mount Lemmon Survey ||  || align=right | 2.1 km || 
|-id=832 bgcolor=#E9E9E9
| 557832 ||  || — || October 11, 2010 || Mount Lemmon || Mount Lemmon Survey ||  || align=right | 1.9 km || 
|-id=833 bgcolor=#E9E9E9
| 557833 ||  || — || August 26, 2009 || Catalina || CSS ||  || align=right | 2.9 km || 
|-id=834 bgcolor=#E9E9E9
| 557834 ||  || — || March 15, 2012 || Mount Lemmon || Mount Lemmon Survey ||  || align=right | 1.3 km || 
|-id=835 bgcolor=#d6d6d6
| 557835 ||  || — || October 10, 2008 || Mount Lemmon || Mount Lemmon Survey ||  || align=right | 2.7 km || 
|-id=836 bgcolor=#E9E9E9
| 557836 ||  || — || August 30, 2005 || Palomar || NEAT ||  || align=right | 2.3 km || 
|-id=837 bgcolor=#E9E9E9
| 557837 ||  || — || April 20, 2012 || Haleakala || Pan-STARRS ||  || align=right | 3.3 km || 
|-id=838 bgcolor=#d6d6d6
| 557838 ||  || — || January 27, 2011 || Mount Lemmon || Mount Lemmon Survey ||  || align=right | 2.1 km || 
|-id=839 bgcolor=#E9E9E9
| 557839 ||  || — || November 22, 2014 || Mount Lemmon || Mount Lemmon Survey ||  || align=right data-sort-value="0.92" | 920 m || 
|-id=840 bgcolor=#E9E9E9
| 557840 ||  || — || October 2, 2014 || Haleakala || Pan-STARRS ||  || align=right data-sort-value="0.88" | 880 m || 
|-id=841 bgcolor=#d6d6d6
| 557841 ||  || — || November 16, 2014 || Mount Lemmon || Mount Lemmon Survey ||  || align=right | 2.0 km || 
|-id=842 bgcolor=#E9E9E9
| 557842 ||  || — || January 10, 2011 || Mount Lemmon || Mount Lemmon Survey ||  || align=right | 1.3 km || 
|-id=843 bgcolor=#E9E9E9
| 557843 ||  || — || September 18, 2001 || Kitt Peak || SDSS ||  || align=right | 1.7 km || 
|-id=844 bgcolor=#E9E9E9
| 557844 ||  || — || December 6, 2010 || Mount Lemmon || Mount Lemmon Survey ||  || align=right | 1.4 km || 
|-id=845 bgcolor=#E9E9E9
| 557845 ||  || — || December 2, 2010 || Mount Lemmon || Mount Lemmon Survey ||  || align=right | 2.0 km || 
|-id=846 bgcolor=#d6d6d6
| 557846 ||  || — || October 25, 2014 || Haleakala || Pan-STARRS ||  || align=right | 1.8 km || 
|-id=847 bgcolor=#E9E9E9
| 557847 ||  || — || December 2, 2010 || Kitt Peak || Spacewatch ||  || align=right | 1.6 km || 
|-id=848 bgcolor=#E9E9E9
| 557848 ||  || — || April 8, 2013 || Kitt Peak || Spacewatch ||  || align=right | 1.5 km || 
|-id=849 bgcolor=#E9E9E9
| 557849 ||  || — || November 26, 2010 || Mount Lemmon || Mount Lemmon Survey ||  || align=right | 1.4 km || 
|-id=850 bgcolor=#E9E9E9
| 557850 ||  || — || April 27, 2012 || Haleakala || Pan-STARRS ||  || align=right | 1.3 km || 
|-id=851 bgcolor=#E9E9E9
| 557851 ||  || — || August 23, 2014 || Haleakala || Pan-STARRS ||  || align=right | 2.0 km || 
|-id=852 bgcolor=#E9E9E9
| 557852 ||  || — || April 27, 2012 || Kitt Peak || Pan-STARRS ||  || align=right | 2.2 km || 
|-id=853 bgcolor=#E9E9E9
| 557853 ||  || — || January 15, 2007 || Mauna Kea || Mauna Kea Obs. ||  || align=right data-sort-value="0.84" | 840 m || 
|-id=854 bgcolor=#fefefe
| 557854 ||  || — || October 23, 2014 || Mount Lemmon || CSS || H || align=right data-sort-value="0.66" | 660 m || 
|-id=855 bgcolor=#E9E9E9
| 557855 ||  || — || August 23, 2014 || Haleakala || Pan-STARRS ||  || align=right | 1.9 km || 
|-id=856 bgcolor=#d6d6d6
| 557856 ||  || — || October 28, 2014 || Mount Lemmon || Mount Lemmon Survey ||  || align=right | 1.8 km || 
|-id=857 bgcolor=#d6d6d6
| 557857 ||  || — || November 22, 2014 || Haleakala || Pan-STARRS ||  || align=right | 1.8 km || 
|-id=858 bgcolor=#E9E9E9
| 557858 ||  || — || August 29, 2005 || Kitt Peak || Spacewatch ||  || align=right | 1.1 km || 
|-id=859 bgcolor=#d6d6d6
| 557859 ||  || — || October 29, 2014 || Haleakala || Pan-STARRS ||  || align=right | 2.0 km || 
|-id=860 bgcolor=#E9E9E9
| 557860 ||  || — || June 7, 2013 || Haleakala || Pan-STARRS ||  || align=right | 1.4 km || 
|-id=861 bgcolor=#E9E9E9
| 557861 ||  || — || September 20, 2014 || Haleakala || Pan-STARRS ||  || align=right | 1.2 km || 
|-id=862 bgcolor=#E9E9E9
| 557862 ||  || — || August 13, 2004 || Cerro Tololo || Cerro Tololo Obs. ||  || align=right | 2.2 km || 
|-id=863 bgcolor=#E9E9E9
| 557863 ||  || — || March 13, 2012 || Haleakala || Pan-STARRS ||  || align=right | 2.1 km || 
|-id=864 bgcolor=#E9E9E9
| 557864 ||  || — || July 15, 2013 || Haleakala || Pan-STARRS ||  || align=right | 1.2 km || 
|-id=865 bgcolor=#E9E9E9
| 557865 ||  || — || November 22, 2014 || Haleakala || Pan-STARRS ||  || align=right | 1.7 km || 
|-id=866 bgcolor=#E9E9E9
| 557866 ||  || — || September 20, 2014 || Haleakala || Pan-STARRS ||  || align=right | 1.5 km || 
|-id=867 bgcolor=#E9E9E9
| 557867 ||  || — || November 22, 2014 || Haleakala || Pan-STARRS ||  || align=right data-sort-value="0.89" | 890 m || 
|-id=868 bgcolor=#E9E9E9
| 557868 ||  || — || September 16, 2009 || Mount Lemmon || Mount Lemmon Survey ||  || align=right | 1.9 km || 
|-id=869 bgcolor=#d6d6d6
| 557869 ||  || — || November 22, 2014 || Haleakala || Pan-STARRS ||  || align=right | 1.8 km || 
|-id=870 bgcolor=#E9E9E9
| 557870 ||  || — || November 16, 2010 || Mount Lemmon || Mount Lemmon Survey ||  || align=right | 2.3 km || 
|-id=871 bgcolor=#E9E9E9
| 557871 ||  || — || November 22, 2014 || Kitt Peak || Pan-STARRS ||  || align=right | 1.7 km || 
|-id=872 bgcolor=#E9E9E9
| 557872 ||  || — || July 4, 2005 || Palomar || NEAT || ADE || align=right | 2.3 km || 
|-id=873 bgcolor=#E9E9E9
| 557873 ||  || — || November 11, 2001 || Apache Point || SDSS Collaboration || ADE || align=right | 1.4 km || 
|-id=874 bgcolor=#d6d6d6
| 557874 ||  || — || October 23, 2003 || Mount Lemmon || SDSS ||  || align=right | 3.1 km || 
|-id=875 bgcolor=#E9E9E9
| 557875 ||  || — || September 22, 2014 || Haleakala || Pan-STARRS ||  || align=right | 1.4 km || 
|-id=876 bgcolor=#d6d6d6
| 557876 ||  || — || November 22, 2014 || Haleakala || Pan-STARRS ||  || align=right | 1.5 km || 
|-id=877 bgcolor=#E9E9E9
| 557877 ||  || — || July 1, 2013 || Haleakala || Pan-STARRS ||  || align=right | 1.0 km || 
|-id=878 bgcolor=#E9E9E9
| 557878 ||  || — || January 26, 2012 || Mount Lemmon || Mount Lemmon Survey ||  || align=right data-sort-value="0.92" | 920 m || 
|-id=879 bgcolor=#E9E9E9
| 557879 ||  || — || October 23, 2014 || Kitt Peak || Spacewatch ||  || align=right | 1.7 km || 
|-id=880 bgcolor=#E9E9E9
| 557880 ||  || — || October 28, 2014 || Mount Lemmon || Mount Lemmon Survey ||  || align=right | 1.7 km || 
|-id=881 bgcolor=#d6d6d6
| 557881 ||  || — || November 22, 2014 || Haleakala || Pan-STARRS ||  || align=right | 2.0 km || 
|-id=882 bgcolor=#E9E9E9
| 557882 ||  || — || February 21, 2007 || Mount Lemmon || Mount Lemmon Survey ||  || align=right | 1.7 km || 
|-id=883 bgcolor=#E9E9E9
| 557883 ||  || — || February 23, 2012 || Mount Lemmon || Mount Lemmon Survey ||  || align=right | 1.4 km || 
|-id=884 bgcolor=#E9E9E9
| 557884 ||  || — || September 21, 2009 || Kitt Peak || Mount Lemmon Survey ||  || align=right | 2.0 km || 
|-id=885 bgcolor=#d6d6d6
| 557885 ||  || — || November 22, 2014 || Haleakala || Pan-STARRS ||  || align=right | 2.5 km || 
|-id=886 bgcolor=#d6d6d6
| 557886 ||  || — || November 22, 2014 || Haleakala || Pan-STARRS ||  || align=right | 1.8 km || 
|-id=887 bgcolor=#E9E9E9
| 557887 ||  || — || March 30, 2008 || Kitt Peak || Spacewatch ||  || align=right | 2.7 km || 
|-id=888 bgcolor=#d6d6d6
| 557888 ||  || — || January 6, 2010 || Kitt Peak || Spacewatch ||  || align=right | 2.7 km || 
|-id=889 bgcolor=#E9E9E9
| 557889 ||  || — || October 25, 2014 || Haleakala || Pan-STARRS ||  || align=right | 2.1 km || 
|-id=890 bgcolor=#d6d6d6
| 557890 ||  || — || November 1, 2014 || Mount Lemmon || Mount Lemmon Survey ||  || align=right | 2.0 km || 
|-id=891 bgcolor=#d6d6d6
| 557891 ||  || — || November 10, 2014 || Haleakala || Pan-STARRS ||  || align=right | 2.9 km || 
|-id=892 bgcolor=#E9E9E9
| 557892 ||  || — || September 18, 2009 || Kitt Peak || Spacewatch ||  || align=right | 1.9 km || 
|-id=893 bgcolor=#d6d6d6
| 557893 ||  || — || November 23, 2014 || Haleakala || Pan-STARRS ||  || align=right | 2.6 km || 
|-id=894 bgcolor=#d6d6d6
| 557894 ||  || — || November 19, 2008 || Kitt Peak || Spacewatch ||  || align=right | 3.5 km || 
|-id=895 bgcolor=#fefefe
| 557895 ||  || — || November 23, 2011 || Kitt Peak || Spacewatch || H || align=right data-sort-value="0.77" | 770 m || 
|-id=896 bgcolor=#d6d6d6
| 557896 ||  || — || October 4, 2007 || Mount Lemmon || Mount Lemmon Survey ||  || align=right | 2.3 km || 
|-id=897 bgcolor=#d6d6d6
| 557897 ||  || — || September 12, 2007 || Mount Lemmon || Mount Lemmon Survey ||  || align=right | 3.3 km || 
|-id=898 bgcolor=#d6d6d6
| 557898 ||  || — || November 23, 2014 || Haleakala || Pan-STARRS ||  || align=right | 2.9 km || 
|-id=899 bgcolor=#d6d6d6
| 557899 ||  || — || October 26, 2014 || Mount Lemmon || Mount Lemmon Survey ||  || align=right | 1.9 km || 
|-id=900 bgcolor=#E9E9E9
| 557900 ||  || — || August 30, 2014 || Kitt Peak || Pan-STARRS ||  || align=right | 1.9 km || 
|}

557901–558000 

|-bgcolor=#fefefe
| 557901 ||  || — || November 26, 2014 || Mount Lemmon || Mount Lemmon Survey || H || align=right data-sort-value="0.76" | 760 m || 
|-id=902 bgcolor=#fefefe
| 557902 ||  || — || December 12, 2006 || Palomar || NEAT || H || align=right data-sort-value="0.61" | 610 m || 
|-id=903 bgcolor=#fefefe
| 557903 ||  || — || November 26, 2014 || Mount Lemmon || Mount Lemmon Survey || H || align=right data-sort-value="0.92" | 920 m || 
|-id=904 bgcolor=#E9E9E9
| 557904 ||  || — || June 2, 2013 || Nogales || M. Schwartz, P. R. Holvorcem ||  || align=right | 1.7 km || 
|-id=905 bgcolor=#E9E9E9
| 557905 ||  || — || October 24, 2014 || Kitt Peak || Spacewatch ||  || align=right | 1.4 km || 
|-id=906 bgcolor=#E9E9E9
| 557906 ||  || — || January 29, 2011 || Mount Lemmon || Mount Lemmon Survey ||  || align=right | 1.6 km || 
|-id=907 bgcolor=#E9E9E9
| 557907 ||  || — || September 16, 2009 || Kitt Peak || Spacewatch ||  || align=right | 1.6 km || 
|-id=908 bgcolor=#E9E9E9
| 557908 ||  || — || August 31, 2005 || Kitt Peak || Spacewatch ||  || align=right | 1.1 km || 
|-id=909 bgcolor=#E9E9E9
| 557909 ||  || — || December 5, 2010 || Kitt Peak || Spacewatch ||  || align=right | 2.0 km || 
|-id=910 bgcolor=#d6d6d6
| 557910 ||  || — || August 27, 2013 || Haleakala || Pan-STARRS ||  || align=right | 3.5 km || 
|-id=911 bgcolor=#E9E9E9
| 557911 ||  || — || October 30, 2014 || Mount Lemmon || Mount Lemmon Survey ||  || align=right | 1.1 km || 
|-id=912 bgcolor=#E9E9E9
| 557912 ||  || — || November 25, 2005 || Kitt Peak || Spacewatch ||  || align=right | 1.5 km || 
|-id=913 bgcolor=#E9E9E9
| 557913 ||  || — || September 24, 2009 || Kitt Peak || Spacewatch ||  || align=right | 2.4 km || 
|-id=914 bgcolor=#d6d6d6
| 557914 ||  || — || October 25, 2009 || Kitt Peak || Spacewatch ||  || align=right | 2.0 km || 
|-id=915 bgcolor=#d6d6d6
| 557915 ||  || — || July 16, 2013 || Haleakala || Pan-STARRS ||  || align=right | 2.2 km || 
|-id=916 bgcolor=#E9E9E9
| 557916 ||  || — || November 2, 2010 || Mount Lemmon || Mount Lemmon Survey ||  || align=right data-sort-value="0.98" | 980 m || 
|-id=917 bgcolor=#d6d6d6
| 557917 ||  || — || October 26, 2008 || Mount Lemmon || Mount Lemmon Survey ||  || align=right | 2.1 km || 
|-id=918 bgcolor=#d6d6d6
| 557918 ||  || — || July 15, 2013 || Haleakala || Pan-STARRS ||  || align=right | 2.3 km || 
|-id=919 bgcolor=#E9E9E9
| 557919 ||  || — || March 23, 2003 || Apache Point || SDSS Collaboration ||  || align=right | 1.5 km || 
|-id=920 bgcolor=#C2FFFF
| 557920 ||  || — || October 25, 2013 || Mount Lemmon || Mount Lemmon Survey || L5 || align=right | 7.4 km || 
|-id=921 bgcolor=#d6d6d6
| 557921 ||  || — || November 22, 2014 || Mount Lemmon || Mount Lemmon Survey ||  || align=right | 2.2 km || 
|-id=922 bgcolor=#E9E9E9
| 557922 ||  || — || October 3, 2014 || Mount Lemmon || Mount Lemmon Survey ||  || align=right | 1.2 km || 
|-id=923 bgcolor=#E9E9E9
| 557923 ||  || — || October 7, 2004 || Kitt Peak || Spacewatch ||  || align=right | 1.7 km || 
|-id=924 bgcolor=#E9E9E9
| 557924 ||  || — || April 19, 2007 || Mount Lemmon || Mount Lemmon Survey ||  || align=right | 1.9 km || 
|-id=925 bgcolor=#d6d6d6
| 557925 ||  || — || April 13, 2011 || Haleakala || Pan-STARRS ||  || align=right | 2.7 km || 
|-id=926 bgcolor=#E9E9E9
| 557926 ||  || — || March 13, 2007 || Mount Lemmon || Mount Lemmon Survey ||  || align=right | 1.8 km || 
|-id=927 bgcolor=#E9E9E9
| 557927 ||  || — || February 13, 2007 || Mount Lemmon || Mount Lemmon Survey ||  || align=right | 1.4 km || 
|-id=928 bgcolor=#d6d6d6
| 557928 ||  || — || December 27, 2003 || Socorro || LINEAR ||  || align=right | 4.7 km || 
|-id=929 bgcolor=#d6d6d6
| 557929 ||  || — || October 8, 2008 || Kitt Peak || Spacewatch ||  || align=right | 2.7 km || 
|-id=930 bgcolor=#E9E9E9
| 557930 ||  || — || January 11, 2011 || Kitt Peak || Spacewatch ||  || align=right | 2.7 km || 
|-id=931 bgcolor=#d6d6d6
| 557931 ||  || — || July 15, 2013 || Haleakala || Pan-STARRS ||  || align=right | 2.4 km || 
|-id=932 bgcolor=#E9E9E9
| 557932 ||  || — || July 19, 2001 || Anza || M. White, M. Collins ||  || align=right | 1.3 km || 
|-id=933 bgcolor=#E9E9E9
| 557933 ||  || — || February 1, 2012 || Kitt Peak || Spacewatch ||  || align=right | 1.1 km || 
|-id=934 bgcolor=#E9E9E9
| 557934 ||  || — || October 28, 2014 || Haleakala || Pan-STARRS ||  || align=right | 3.0 km || 
|-id=935 bgcolor=#E9E9E9
| 557935 ||  || — || October 28, 2014 || Haleakala || Pan-STARRS ||  || align=right | 1.6 km || 
|-id=936 bgcolor=#d6d6d6
| 557936 ||  || — || December 17, 2009 || Kitt Peak || Spacewatch ||  || align=right | 2.4 km || 
|-id=937 bgcolor=#d6d6d6
| 557937 ||  || — || October 22, 2003 || Kitt Peak || SDSS ||  || align=right | 2.3 km || 
|-id=938 bgcolor=#d6d6d6
| 557938 ||  || — || July 18, 2013 || Haleakala || Pan-STARRS ||  || align=right | 3.5 km || 
|-id=939 bgcolor=#d6d6d6
| 557939 ||  || — || November 25, 2014 || Haleakala || Pan-STARRS ||  || align=right | 2.3 km || 
|-id=940 bgcolor=#d6d6d6
| 557940 ||  || — || November 26, 2014 || Haleakala || Pan-STARRS ||  || align=right | 1.9 km || 
|-id=941 bgcolor=#E9E9E9
| 557941 ||  || — || January 30, 2011 || Mount Lemmon || Mount Lemmon Survey ||  || align=right | 1.8 km || 
|-id=942 bgcolor=#d6d6d6
| 557942 ||  || — || November 26, 2014 || Haleakala || Pan-STARRS ||  || align=right | 2.3 km || 
|-id=943 bgcolor=#d6d6d6
| 557943 ||  || — || November 19, 2009 || Mount Lemmon || Mount Lemmon Survey ||  || align=right | 1.9 km || 
|-id=944 bgcolor=#E9E9E9
| 557944 ||  || — || November 26, 2014 || Haleakala || Pan-STARRS ||  || align=right | 1.7 km || 
|-id=945 bgcolor=#E9E9E9
| 557945 ||  || — || December 13, 2006 || Mount Lemmon || Mount Lemmon Survey ||  || align=right data-sort-value="0.89" | 890 m || 
|-id=946 bgcolor=#E9E9E9
| 557946 ||  || — || November 30, 2005 || Kitt Peak || Spacewatch ||  || align=right | 2.0 km || 
|-id=947 bgcolor=#d6d6d6
| 557947 ||  || — || October 21, 2003 || Kitt Peak || Spacewatch ||  || align=right | 2.0 km || 
|-id=948 bgcolor=#E9E9E9
| 557948 ||  || — || January 9, 2011 || Charleston || R. Holmes ||  || align=right | 1.6 km || 
|-id=949 bgcolor=#d6d6d6
| 557949 ||  || — || November 26, 2014 || Haleakala || Pan-STARRS ||  || align=right | 2.3 km || 
|-id=950 bgcolor=#d6d6d6
| 557950 ||  || — || October 18, 2009 || Mount Lemmon || Mount Lemmon Survey ||  || align=right | 2.1 km || 
|-id=951 bgcolor=#E9E9E9
| 557951 ||  || — || April 13, 2012 || Haleakala || Pan-STARRS ||  || align=right | 1.8 km || 
|-id=952 bgcolor=#d6d6d6
| 557952 ||  || — || March 2, 2001 || Kitt Peak || Spacewatch ||  || align=right | 2.5 km || 
|-id=953 bgcolor=#d6d6d6
| 557953 ||  || — || December 18, 2003 || Kitt Peak || Spacewatch ||  || align=right | 3.0 km || 
|-id=954 bgcolor=#E9E9E9
| 557954 ||  || — || December 2, 2010 || Kitt Peak || Spacewatch ||  || align=right data-sort-value="0.96" | 960 m || 
|-id=955 bgcolor=#E9E9E9
| 557955 ||  || — || November 26, 2014 || Haleakala || Pan-STARRS ||  || align=right | 1.5 km || 
|-id=956 bgcolor=#d6d6d6
| 557956 ||  || — || November 26, 2014 || Haleakala || Pan-STARRS ||  || align=right | 1.9 km || 
|-id=957 bgcolor=#E9E9E9
| 557957 ||  || — || September 26, 2009 || Kitt Peak || Spacewatch ||  || align=right | 1.7 km || 
|-id=958 bgcolor=#E9E9E9
| 557958 ||  || — || February 7, 2011 || Mount Lemmon || Mount Lemmon Survey ||  || align=right | 1.5 km || 
|-id=959 bgcolor=#E9E9E9
| 557959 ||  || — || November 26, 2014 || Haleakala || Pan-STARRS ||  || align=right | 1.4 km || 
|-id=960 bgcolor=#E9E9E9
| 557960 ||  || — || June 30, 2008 || Kitt Peak || Spacewatch ||  || align=right | 1.9 km || 
|-id=961 bgcolor=#d6d6d6
| 557961 ||  || — || November 26, 2014 || Haleakala || Pan-STARRS ||  || align=right | 2.3 km || 
|-id=962 bgcolor=#E9E9E9
| 557962 ||  || — || March 27, 2012 || Mount Lemmon || Mount Lemmon Survey ||  || align=right | 2.4 km || 
|-id=963 bgcolor=#E9E9E9
| 557963 ||  || — || May 28, 2009 || Mount Lemmon || Mount Lemmon Survey ||  || align=right data-sort-value="0.92" | 920 m || 
|-id=964 bgcolor=#E9E9E9
| 557964 ||  || — || November 30, 2005 || Socorro || LINEAR ||  || align=right | 1.6 km || 
|-id=965 bgcolor=#d6d6d6
| 557965 ||  || — || December 17, 1998 || Kitt Peak || Spacewatch ||  || align=right | 2.4 km || 
|-id=966 bgcolor=#d6d6d6
| 557966 ||  || — || September 29, 2008 || Mount Lemmon || Mount Lemmon Survey ||  || align=right | 2.6 km || 
|-id=967 bgcolor=#d6d6d6
| 557967 ||  || — || August 13, 2012 || Haleakala || Pan-STARRS ||  || align=right | 3.5 km || 
|-id=968 bgcolor=#d6d6d6
| 557968 ||  || — || December 7, 2013 || Catalina || Pan-STARRS ||  || align=right | 3.7 km || 
|-id=969 bgcolor=#d6d6d6
| 557969 ||  || — || April 14, 2005 || Kitt Peak || Spacewatch ||  || align=right | 3.1 km || 
|-id=970 bgcolor=#E9E9E9
| 557970 ||  || — || December 17, 2001 || Socorro || LINEAR ||  || align=right | 1.6 km || 
|-id=971 bgcolor=#E9E9E9
| 557971 ||  || — || December 26, 2006 || Kitt Peak || Spacewatch ||  || align=right data-sort-value="0.80" | 800 m || 
|-id=972 bgcolor=#d6d6d6
| 557972 ||  || — || November 20, 2014 || Mount Lemmon || Mount Lemmon Survey || 7:4 || align=right | 2.6 km || 
|-id=973 bgcolor=#d6d6d6
| 557973 ||  || — || November 16, 2014 || Mount Lemmon || Mount Lemmon Survey ||  || align=right | 2.4 km || 
|-id=974 bgcolor=#E9E9E9
| 557974 ||  || — || February 17, 2007 || Socorro || LINEAR ||  || align=right | 1.6 km || 
|-id=975 bgcolor=#d6d6d6
| 557975 ||  || — || April 13, 2011 || Mount Lemmon || Mount Lemmon Survey ||  || align=right | 2.7 km || 
|-id=976 bgcolor=#d6d6d6
| 557976 ||  || — || November 27, 2014 || Mount Lemmon || Mount Lemmon Survey ||  || align=right | 2.3 km || 
|-id=977 bgcolor=#E9E9E9
| 557977 ||  || — || January 30, 2011 || Mount Lemmon || Mount Lemmon Survey ||  || align=right | 1.7 km || 
|-id=978 bgcolor=#d6d6d6
| 557978 ||  || — || November 16, 2014 || Kitt Peak || Spacewatch ||  || align=right | 2.4 km || 
|-id=979 bgcolor=#E9E9E9
| 557979 ||  || — || October 29, 2014 || Kitt Peak || Spacewatch ||  || align=right | 1.2 km || 
|-id=980 bgcolor=#E9E9E9
| 557980 ||  || — || January 30, 2011 || Mount Lemmon || Mount Lemmon Survey ||  || align=right | 1.7 km || 
|-id=981 bgcolor=#E9E9E9
| 557981 ||  || — || September 14, 2005 || Kitt Peak || Spacewatch ||  || align=right | 1.1 km || 
|-id=982 bgcolor=#E9E9E9
| 557982 ||  || — || November 1, 2000 || Kitt Peak || Spacewatch ||  || align=right | 1.8 km || 
|-id=983 bgcolor=#E9E9E9
| 557983 ||  || — || March 9, 2007 || Kitt Peak || Spacewatch ||  || align=right | 1.7 km || 
|-id=984 bgcolor=#d6d6d6
| 557984 ||  || — || November 27, 2014 || Haleakala || Pan-STARRS ||  || align=right | 2.2 km || 
|-id=985 bgcolor=#E9E9E9
| 557985 ||  || — || September 25, 2014 || Mount Lemmon || Mount Lemmon Survey ||  || align=right | 1.9 km || 
|-id=986 bgcolor=#E9E9E9
| 557986 ||  || — || October 22, 2014 || Mount Lemmon || Mount Lemmon Survey ||  || align=right | 2.0 km || 
|-id=987 bgcolor=#d6d6d6
| 557987 ||  || — || January 4, 2010 || Kitt Peak || Spacewatch ||  || align=right | 2.4 km || 
|-id=988 bgcolor=#d6d6d6
| 557988 ||  || — || August 9, 2013 || Kitt Peak || Spacewatch ||  || align=right | 2.4 km || 
|-id=989 bgcolor=#E9E9E9
| 557989 ||  || — || March 19, 2007 || Mount Lemmon || Mount Lemmon Survey ||  || align=right | 2.6 km || 
|-id=990 bgcolor=#E9E9E9
| 557990 ||  || — || October 18, 2009 || Mount Lemmon || Mount Lemmon Survey ||  || align=right | 2.0 km || 
|-id=991 bgcolor=#d6d6d6
| 557991 ||  || — || September 18, 2014 || Haleakala || Pan-STARRS ||  || align=right | 2.5 km || 
|-id=992 bgcolor=#E9E9E9
| 557992 ||  || — || October 2, 2014 || Haleakala || Pan-STARRS ||  || align=right data-sort-value="0.87" | 870 m || 
|-id=993 bgcolor=#E9E9E9
| 557993 ||  || — || September 29, 2009 || Mount Lemmon || Mount Lemmon Survey ||  || align=right | 2.4 km || 
|-id=994 bgcolor=#E9E9E9
| 557994 ||  || — || October 28, 2005 || Kitt Peak || Spacewatch ||  || align=right | 1.2 km || 
|-id=995 bgcolor=#d6d6d6
| 557995 ||  || — || October 10, 2008 || Mount Lemmon || Mount Lemmon Survey ||  || align=right | 1.7 km || 
|-id=996 bgcolor=#E9E9E9
| 557996 ||  || — || September 17, 2009 || Kitt Peak || Spacewatch ||  || align=right | 2.0 km || 
|-id=997 bgcolor=#d6d6d6
| 557997 ||  || — || October 28, 2014 || Kitt Peak || Spacewatch ||  || align=right | 2.1 km || 
|-id=998 bgcolor=#E9E9E9
| 557998 ||  || — || September 16, 2009 || Kitt Peak || Spacewatch ||  || align=right | 1.5 km || 
|-id=999 bgcolor=#E9E9E9
| 557999 ||  || — || January 30, 2011 || Kitt Peak || Spacewatch ||  || align=right | 1.7 km || 
|-id=000 bgcolor=#E9E9E9
| 558000 ||  || — || March 26, 2007 || Kitt Peak || Mount Lemmon Survey ||  || align=right | 2.2 km || 
|}

References

External links 
 Discovery Circumstances: Numbered Minor Planets (555001)–(560000) (IAU Minor Planet Center)

0557